= Kravets =

Kravets is a Ukrainian-language occupational surname meaning "tailor".

The surname may refer to:

- Andriy Kravets (born 1990), Ukrainian Go player
- Alla Kravets (born 1973), Ukrainian volleyball player
- Artem Kravets (born 1989), Ukrainian footballer
- Darya Kravets (born 1994), Ukrainian footballer
- Evan Kravetz (born 1996), American Major League Baseball pitcher
- Inessa Kravets (born 1966), Ukrainian athlete
- Jean-Jacques Kravetz (born 1947), French musician
- Lyudmyla Kravets (1923–2015), Soviet-Ukrainian combat medic
- Marina Kravets (born 1984), Russian actress and singer
- Mikhail Kravets (born 1963), Russian ice hockey player
- Olena Kravets (born 1977), Ukrainian actress and TV host
- Torichan Kravets (1876–1955), Russian-Soviet physicist
- Uladzislau Kravets (born 1999), Belarusian canoeist
- Vasyl Kravets (born 1997), Ukrainian footballer
- Volodymyr Kravets (1930–2011), Ukrainian diplomat
- Volodymyr Kravets (boxer) (born 1981), Ukrainian boxer

== See also ==
- Kravitz, Krawiec, related surnames
