= Kravits =

Kravits, Kravitz, Krawitz, Kravit, and variant spellings are Yiddish occupational surnames derived from the Ukrainian word кравець (see Kravets), "tailor". They are related to the Polish name Krawiec, and Kravets.

The surname may refer to:

- Amy Kravitz, American film director
- Andy Kravitz, American drummer
- Asher Kravitz (born 1969), Israeli humorist, physicist, and mathematician
- Danny Kravitz (1930–2013), American baseball player
- Dick Kravitz (born 1941), American politician
- Edward Kravitz (born 1932), American neuroscientist
- Evan Kravetz (born 1996), American Major League Baseball pitcher
- Jason Kravits (born 1967), American actor
- Jean-Jacques Kravetz (born 1947), French keyboardist, saxophonist, and composer
- Kevin Krawietz (born 1992), German tennis player
- Lee Kravitz, American journalist
- Lenny Kravitz (born 1964), American musician
- Leonard M. Kravitz, American soldier
- Lou Kravitz, American labor racketeer
- Mark R. Kravitz (1950–2012), American judge
- Michael Krawitz, American cannabis activist
- Nina Kraviz (Nina Kravits), Russian DJ
- Peter Kravitz, Scottish author and critic
- Pinky Kravitz (1927–2015), American journalist
- Ted Kravitz (born 1974), British presenter and reporter
- Tony Krawitz, Australian filmmaker, co-director of Firebite, among others
- Zoë Kravitz (born 1988), American singer and actress

== Fictional characters ==
- Duddy Kravitz, fictional character from the novel The Apprenticeship of Duddy Kravitz, by Mordecai Richler
- Gladys Kravitz, fictional character from the TV series Bewitched

== See also ==
- Krawiec
