= Tabaluga (TV series) =

Animated series

- Title card
- Genre: Fantasy; Animated series
- Created by: Helme Heine; Peter Maffay; Gregor Rottschalk; Rolf Zuckowski
- Based on: Tabaluga by Peter Maffay
- Written by: Gregor Rottschalk; Heike Lagé; John Palmer; Dale Scott; Susan Beak; Geoff Beak; David Witt; Malcom McGookin; Christopher Plowright; David Evans; Yoram Gross; Athol Henry; Sally Odgers; Michael Maurer; Phil Sanders; Melanie Alexander; Adam Bowen; Grant Fraser; Chris Phillips; Rhett Walton
- Directed by: Yoram Gross (Season 1–2); David Evans (Season 3 & TV movie)
- Voices of: Jamie Oxenbould; Keith Scott; Robyn Moore; Troy Planet (Season 2–3); Sarah Aubrey (Season 3 & TV movie); Shane Withington (TV movie)
- Opening theme: "Tabaluga's Song", performed by Peter Rudolph Heinen
- Ending theme: "Nessaja's Song", composed by Peter Maffay "Tabaluga's Song" performed by Peter Rudolph Heinen (TV movie)
- Composers: Peter Wagner (Season 1–2); Andy Sedlmaier (Season 1–2); Clive Harrison (Season 3); Guy Gross (TV movie)
- Countries of origin: Germany; Australia
- Original languages: German; English
- No. of seasons: 3
- No. of episodes: 78

Production
- Executive producers: Sandra Gross (Season 1); Tim Brooke-Hunt (Season 1); Dr. Sylvia Rothblum (Season 2); Matthias Schulze (Season 3); Hans-Jürgen Steimer (Season 3); Geoff Watson (Season 3)
- Producers: Yoram Gross (Season 1–2); Franziska Guderian (Season 3); Andre Kussmaul (Season 3); Anke Steinbacher (Season 3); Rodney Whitham (Season 3)
- Editors: Antonietta Sisinni (Season 1); Andrew MacNeil (Season 1); Christopher Plowright (Season 1); Roger Grant (Season 2); Dee Liebenberg (Season 2); David Stiven (Season 2)
- Running time: 22 minutes
- Production companies: ZDF Enterprises; Yoram Gross Film Studios (Season 1); Yoram Gross-EM.TV (Season 2–3 & TV movie); EM.Entertainment

Original release
- Network: ZDF; Seven Network
- Release: October 4, 1997 – June 19, 2004

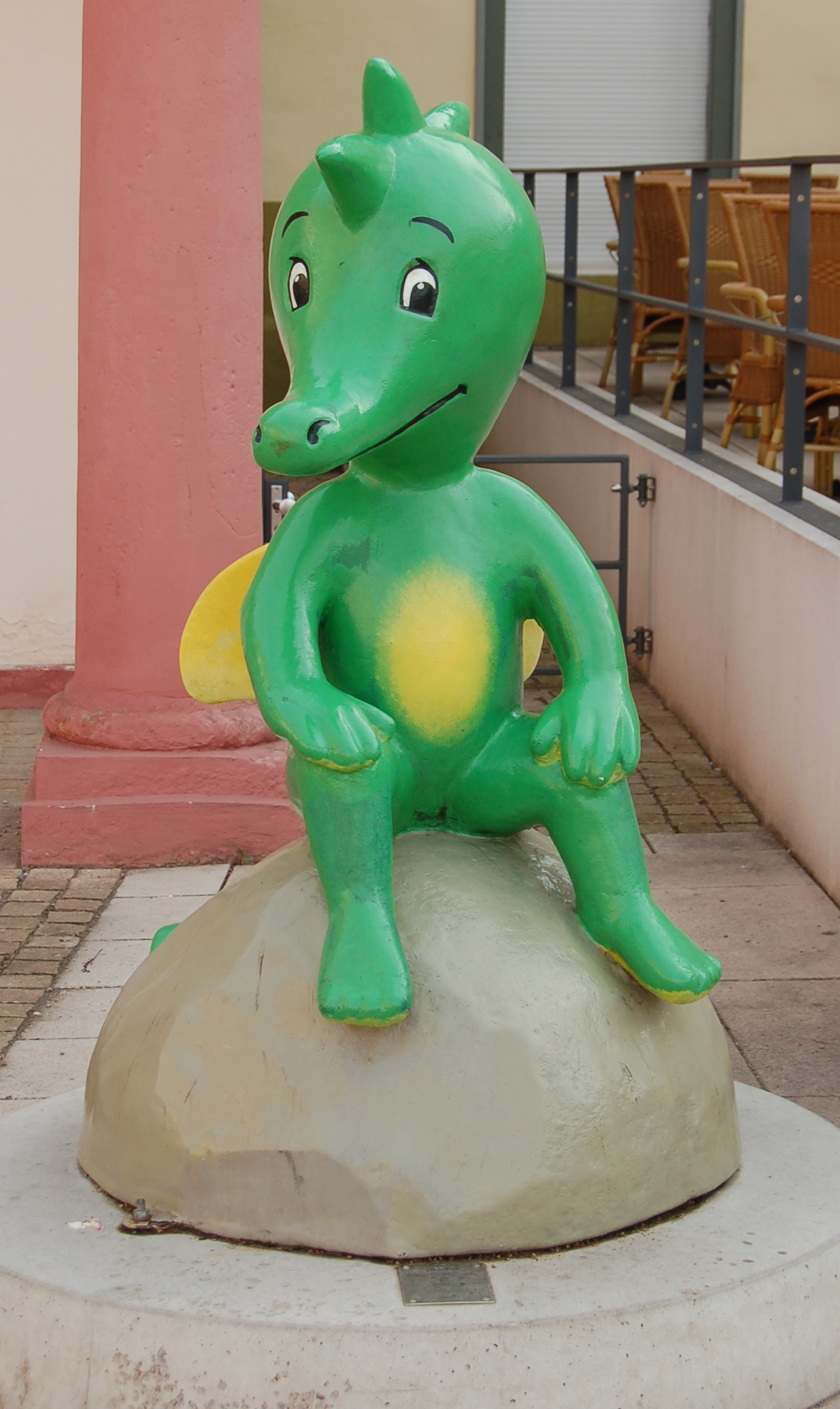
Statue of Tabaluga in Erfurt

Tabaluga is an animated television series produced by Yoram Gross Film Studios and Yoram Gross-EM.TV, based on the character of the same name created by Peter Maffay. In this series, Tabaluga is the last of the dragons and lives in Greenland, a magical place inhabited by talking animals of many different species. Tabaluga must defend his home from Iceland, a frigid arctic tundra, ruled by the evil snowman Arktos. In Season 2, he must also deal with a searing desert, ruled by an evil sand-spirit named Humsin.

A German-Australian co-production, the series was shown on Seven Network in Australia and ZDF in Germany. It was also shown on the Fox Family Channel from 1998 to 2001 in the United States. In the first season, there are many references to the albums. For example, the snake, Bilingua (Tabaluga und das leuchtende Schweigen) and the spider Tarantula (Tabaluga und Lilli) make one-off appearances in the series. Special mention goes to Lilli, who Tabaluga falls in love with in the third album, Tabaluga und Lilli. Season 1, Episode 23, Tabaluga and Lilli, is dedicated to their love story.

== Plot ==
The series focuses on Tabaluga, the last dragon living in Greenland, a land occupied by intelligent, talking animals. As a dragon he is tasked with defending Greenland against the evil snowman Arktos. In the second season, he must also defend Greenland against the desert spirit Humsin.

== Characters ==
=== Residents of Greenland ===
- Tabaluga: A small green dragon who is the main protagonist of the series. He is the son of Tyrion and is thought to be the last one of his kind until a secret world of dragons was found in Season 3, Episode 25. In Season 2, he is revealed to be the prince of Greenland. He is voiced by Jamie Oxenbould in English and is voiced by Björn Schalla in Season 1 and Dietmar Wunder in Season 2 and 3 in German.
- Happy: A snow hare who used to live in Iceland, but after she was freed by Tabaluga in Season 1, Episode 2, she went to live in Greenland and became one of Tabaluga's best friends. She is voiced by Robyn Moore in English and by Sabine Manke in German.
- Digby: A mole from Greenland who wears glasses and is one of Tabaluga's good friends. He is voiced by Robyn Moore in English and by Edeltraud Esner in Season 1 and 2 and by Santiago Ziesmer in Season 3 in German.
- Nessaja: A giant turtle who acts as a mentor and advisor to Tabaluga. She is voiced by Robyn Moore in English and Inken Sommer in German.
- Buzz: A bee and one of Tabaluga's good friends. He lives in Greenland in a hive with the other bees. He is voiced by Robyn Moore in English and by Maja Dürr in German.
- Bilingua: A snake and a minor villain. She had shown in at least one episode that she had the power of hypnosis.
- Tyrion: The previous ruler of Greenland and father of Tabaluga. When he died, he turned into a star, like all other dragons. He occasionally appears to Tabaluga in spirit form to offer him some advice. He is voiced by Keith Scott in English.
- Ruby: A hummingbird and a best friend of Buzz and Digby. He is voiced by Keith Scott in English and by Helmut Gauß in German.

=== Iceworld ===
- Arktos: The main antagonist and Tabaluga's arch-enemy. He is an evil snowman who aims to cover the world in a tomb of snow and ice. He is also the king of Iceworld. He has a hall of fame that contains animals who have been frozen by him. He is fond of ice cream. Despite his hatred for Tabaluga, he has sometimes teamed up with him when the situation called for it. He is voiced by Keith Scott in English and Frank Ciazynski in German.
- James: The polite and gentle penguin who serves Arktos and pilots his master's transport, The Arktoplane. When the penguins of Iceworld temporarily left the evil snowman, James was the only one who remained at his side. He is voiced by Keith Scott in English and by Eberhard Prüter in German.
- Attila the walrus: Arktos' cook.
- Shouhu: An owl who can see the events of Greenland through his crystal ball. He was Arktos' prisoner and advisor under Tyrion's orders in Season 1 to make sure Arktos does not become too great of a threat. In Season 1, Episode 25, James accidentally helps him escape. After that, Shouhu becomes another mentor and advisor to Tabaluga alongside Nessaja. He is voiced by Keith Scott in English and by Peter Schiff in Season 1 and by Andreas Mannkopff in Season 2 and 3 in German.
- Vultur: A reconnaissance spy and messenger for Arktos, but then changed allegiance to Humsin. In Season 3, Episode 2, he joins Arktos again. He is voiced by Keith Scott in English and Bodo Wolf in German.
- Rex: Arktos' pet shark, who often tries to eat his carrot nose, despite hating carrots. Arktos had James send Rex to obedience school, where Rex graduated at the top of the class. He escaped at the end of Season 1.
- Lilly (or Lilli): A sculpture created by Arktos. When Tabaluga saw Lilly for the first time, he immediately had a strange but wonderful emotion he couldn`t explain to himself - all he could think or dream about was Lilly.

=== Desert Realm ===
- Humsin: Humsin serves as a secondary antagonist and is Tabaluga's second archenemy in Season 2. He is the ruler of the desert realm and wants to make Greenland into a desert. Arktos and him are rivals and the two fight a lot. Like how Arktos is fond of ice cream, Humsin is fond of salty potato chips. He can turn into a whirlwind of sand. He dies at the end of Season 2 when he falls over a waterfall. He is voiced by Jörg Hengstler in German.
- Kayo: An accident-prone Chameleon who worked for Humsin, but in Season 3, he tries to joins Arktos' side, but is rejected many times. At the end of Season 3, Episode 22, after being rejected by Arktos yet again, he decides to join Tabaluga and becomes a new resident of Greenland. He is voiced by Stefan Krause in German.
- Ostrich: An accountant and a female ostrich. Worker for Humsin.

== Episodes ==
=== Season 1 (1997–1998) ===
#	Title	Summary	Air Date
1	The Last One of His Kind	As Arktos spoils Greenland's tranquility, Digby, Ruby, and Buzz, stumble upon an egg, out of which hatches the last dragon Tabaluga. Tabaluga escapes Arktos and then learns of his destiny.	4 October 1997 (Germany)
2	Happy Without Ending	Tabaluga tumbles into the Iceworld and releases his newfound friend Happy, and they escape and rescue a defecting Fox Dandy, who leads them to Greenland.	11 October 1997 (Germany)
3	A Very Hot Thing	Arktos has Vultur start a fire on the Greenland beach after seeing Tabaluga and his friends having a barbecue. The fire forces Greenland's inhabitants to evacuate to Nessaja's island, as it's the only place in Greenland surrounded by water. All the birds and bees fan the fire to blow it towards Glasstown and then Arktos is forced to extinguish it.	18 October 1997 (Germany)
4	Servant of Two Masters	Vultur takes Digby to Iceworld. The Greenlanders create a diversion, while Tabaluga and Happy rescue Digby along with some other animals, as well as learning Shouhu's purpose.	25 October 1997 (Germany)
5	Dubious Dealings	Worry rises in Greenland when the night is longer than normal. Arktos takes advantage of this, but Tabaluga catches wind of Arktos' deception and reveals the darkness was just an eclipse.	1 November 1997 (Germany)
6	One Dragon Too Many	Arktos sends a flying dragon lizard to impersonate Tabaluga and stir things up in Greenland. Tabaluga outdoes the imposter when he rescues Happy and helps him to fit in.	8 November 1997 (Germany)
7	The Wiser Head Does Not Give Up	Arktos has developed a new weapon to spread his ice. Tabaluga has a dilemma to prepare for the worst, but decides to give himself up in order to infiltrate Glasstown and put the new weapon out of action.	15 November 1997 (Germany)
8	Two Birds With One Stone	Tabaluga volunteers to rescue Queen Elisabeth XXI's ant army from the clutches of Arktos. Tabaluga infiltrates Glasstown with unexpected help from Happy and forces Arktos to release the ants.	22 November 1997 (Germany)
9	Moonstruck	Tabaluga is intrigued by the Moon and wants to go to there. Arktos' offer to bring him there proves to be an attempt to dispose of him. In an unconscious dream, Tabaluga learns plenty about the Moon.	29 November 1997
10	Dragons Do not Cry	Tabaluga and Happy and Arktos are enjoying themselves. But a new kind of fruit that Happy and Arktos ate has poisoned them. With effort, Tabaluga provides a cure for Happy, then passes it on to Arktos' butler, James.	6 December 1997 (Germany)
11	The Big Cloud	Arktos unleashes a volley of ice clouds to blot out the sun. With help from Prince Ighor, Tabaluga persuades the volcano ant queen to erupt the volcano. It works, but only too well.	13 December 1997 (Germany)
12	The Visitors Who Came in From The Cold	All of Arktos' penguins except James go on strike. While Tabaluga helps the penguins last in Greenland, Iceland falls into disarray. Eventually, Arktos persuades the penguins to return and makes it up to them.	20 December 1997 (Germany)
13	A Fatal Present	Arktos sends a plague of locusts to Greenland. With all options failing, Tabaluga seeks the help of the giant Black Widow spider Tarantula. Her siren song works, with all Greenlanders evading it.	27 December 1997 (Germany)
14	A Ruined Premiere	To stifle his boredom, Arktos sends James to capture some dolphins for a circus. With the aid of Sawbones the swordfish, Tabaluga and his friends intercept and rescue the dolphins.	3 January 1998 (Germany)
15	A Matter Full of Seeds	There is a shortage of sunflower seeds for Tabaluga thanks to James' harvest. Tabaluga slips into Glasstown to get back some seeds to enjoy in the future.	10 January 1998 (Germany)
16	Someone Is Cheating	Greenland is holding a sports tournament. Arktos plans to use this tournament to win the land as his own. The Greenlanders win the tournament, thanks to Maurice, a polar whom Arktos outcast.	17 January 1998 (Germany)
17	Mister Nice Guy	After increased attacks on Greenland, Arktos sends James as a clown to steal some fruit. His heist fails, but the Greenlanders lend him a hand, while Tabaluga spreads cheer and happiness in Iceworld.	24 January 1998 (Germany)
18	Too Much Salt Is Detrimental to the Health	James builds a dam to get water for ice cream production. The dam causes a lot of flooding and is contaminated by a salt mine. The beavers manage to destroy the dam and restore the river.	31 January 1998 (Germany)
19	The Tree of Life	Arktos is intent on destroying the Tree of Life, disregarding the consequences of Water cycle imbalance. Tabaluga manages to defrost the Tree of Life and save both Greenland and Iceworld.	7 February 1998 (Germany)
20	Queen For One Day	A snake named Belingua starts hypnotizing the inhabitants of Greenland and Iceworld to make them believe that she is their queen. Tabaluga succeeds in defeating her by using a mirror to reflect her hypnotic gaze back at her.	14 February 1998 (Germany)
21	A Splendid Couple	Today is Happy's Birthday. Arktos sends a snow hare Leon, to befriend Happy, which makes Tabaluga feel lonesome. Both hares and Tabaluga make up, getting captured by Arktos, but the trio make their escape.	21 February 1998 (Germany)
22	A Fiery Encounter	Tabaluga meets the wild honey bees and learns about their ways of living. Arktos sends James to raid the hive for honey. Tabaluga helps the bees repel the next raid and sends James off.	28 February 1998 (Germany)
23	Tabaluga and Lilli	Tabaluga is captivated by Arktos' beautiful girl statue, he calls Lilli, which is haunting him with passion. Happy helps Tabaluga through his dangerous ordeal. Tabaluga manages to bring Lilli to life with his fire, and Tabaluga and Lilli fulfill their love for each other.	7 March 1998 (Germany)
24	The Abducted Scamp	James takes Happy's bullying cousin Bobby to Glasstown for Arktos' gallery. Bobby is as troublesome to Arktos as he was back in Greenland, so Vultur persuades the Greenlanders to take him back.	14 March 1998 (Germany)
25	The Flow of Time	Tabaluga sees a past vision in the River of Time, but has to take care of a river blockage that would spell eternal time freeze for the Greenlanders. After that Shouhu finally has his freedom.	21 March 1998 (Germany)
26	Chocolate Ice for Everybody	Arktos gains the power to spread an early winter to Greenland. With the aid of the giant octopus Tentaculus, Tabaluga brings Arktos to his knees and brings Iceworld and Greenland together.	28 March 1998 (Germany)

=== Season 2 (2001–2002) ===
#	Title	Summary	Air Date
1	Prince Tabaluga	After Tabaluga's coronation, Arktos starts up an ice-cream factory in hopes of overshadowing the new prince. However his business is clearfelling the forests, forcing Tabaluga to rescue everyone from a landslide.	27 October 2001 (Germany)
2	Humsin	Humsin takes advantage of the homeless Greenlanders and spreads a desert in Greenland and Vultur defects to Humsin. Arktos attacks Humsin and the Iceworlders assist Greenland to put Humsin's sand pipeline out of action.	3 November 2001 (Germany)
3	Dangerous confidence	Humsin attacks Greenland with a sand blaster. Arktos nabs the spying Vultur, leaving Tabaluga in a difficult position to save Vultur's life. Arktos uses this opportunity to become Prince, but Vultur exposes his treachery.	10 November 2001 (Germany)
4	Big Freeze	Arktos makes an early winter in Greenland, but the Greenlanders prepare for it. Then Arktos collaborates with Humsin to attack Greenland, but Vultur warns Tabaluga, giving him a chance to repel the attack.	17 November 2001 (Germany)
5	Prophecy	Kayo steals Shouhu's crystal ball to give Humsin some advantage. Artkos leaves thinking he has no future, but James renews his hope. Tabaluga boosts Greenland's morale to thwart Humsin's attack.	24 November 2001 (Germany)
6	Digby, The Hero	Humsin tricks Tabaluga with mirages, giving him the moment to cast a sandstorm over Greenland. Digby feeling discontented with himself rescues Tabaluga then helps him to make rain to wash away Humsin's sand.	1 December 2001 (Germany)
7	Potato Festival	The Greenlanders are hard at harvesting potatoes. Humsin capitalises Greenland of its potato supply. Tabaluga tricks Arktos to start an early winter day to drive Humsin and his lot out of Greenland.	8 December 2001 (Germany)
8	A Spiny Danger	Digby becomes Shouhou's apprentice. A folly in the works, turns Digby into a weremole monster. Digby procures the vital ingredient to cure himself, while Arktos and Humsin fight for the power potion.	15 December 2001 (Germany)
9	Flood	During the Spring Festival, Arktos unleashes some rain showers to flood Greenland. As Happy and some baby animals take shelter, Tabaluga stops Arktos' flooding then tricks Humsin into removing the floodwaters.	22 December 2001 (Germany)
10	The Day of the Cactus	Humsim uses Happy's new growth formula with a cactus to spoil Greenland. Arktos tries to take advantage of the situation, but Tabaluga persuades him to freeze the plant. Tabaluga proceeds to prevent Humsin grow any more weeds.	29 December 2001 (Germany)
11	The Big Change	Humsin captures Nassaja and Shohou, while Tabaluga develops an itching problem mistaken as contagious. Tabaluga is helped by the Outcast colony to save Greenland from Humsin and Arktos.	5 January 2002 (Germany)
12	Sand Fleas	Humsin unleashes a plague of sand fleas to put the Greenlanders in disarray. Tabaluga eventually finds that volcanic water eliminates the fleas, but Buzz provides an alternative.	12 January 2002 (Germany)
13	The Lost Dragon	Humsin plans to capture more lizards for his secret weapon. Tabaluga gets helped by a tribe of Salamanders led by Sally to liberate them from Humsin and prevents Arktos from taking Greenland as its new prince.	19 January 2002 (Germany)
14	My baby	TBA	26 January 2002 (Germany)
15	The Ice Beast	TBA	2 February 2002 (Germany)
16	Double Trouble	TBA	9 February 2002 (Germany)
17	Peace Play	TBA	16 February 2002 (Germany)
18	Genie	TBA	23 February 2002 (Germany)
19	Kidnapped	James' nephews and nieces come to visit, but they soon go missing.	2 March 2002 (Germany)
20	Sweet Dreams Humsin	TBA	9 March 2002 (Germany)
21	The Thunderbird	TBA	16 March 2002 (Germany)
22	Bully for You	TBA	23 March 2002 (Germany)
23	The Scrying Game	TBA	30 March 2002 (Germany)
24	Dragon Mountain	TBA	6 April 2002 (Germany)
25	The Sands of Doom	TBA	13 April 2002 (Germany)
26	Majority Rules	TBA	20 April 2002 (Germany)

=== Season 3 (2003–2004) ===
#	Title	Summary	Air Date
1	The Dragon Pendant	On a new spring season, Tabaluga starts his quest for the dragon pendant. Knowing about it from Kayo, Arktos plans to get the pendant first. Tabaluga narrowly manages to finish the first stage of his quest.	27 December 2003 (Germany)
2	The Quest	Vultur returns to Arktos' service. As Tabaluga starts his quest, Arktos freezes Greenland, but Happy and Digby bring Tabaluga back to send Arktos back before taking Happy and Digby on his quest.	3 January 2004 (Germany)
3	Scary Story	Arktos follows Tabaluga, Happy and Digby on their quest. During a campout, strange noises scare Arktos, Tabaluga and their friends as they run into each other. They eventually find Kayo and a woodmouse are the unwitting monsters.	10 January 2004 (Germany)
4	Tabaluga's Challenge	During an invitation to Ling-Yan's village, Tabaluga is prompted to race Ling-Yan, but then they have to rescue panda twin boys from the river. With that Tabaluga and his friends continue the quest.	17 January 2004 (Germany)
5	Fire Stone	Tabaluga and his friends enter an underground land inhabited by fiery people, who do not approve of the Fire Sign being taken until Tabaluga replaces it to save the land from destruction.	24 January 2004 (Germany)
6	Little Wonder	Happy accidentally shrinks Tabaluga with one of Shouhou's potions. Kayo gets that potion and shrinks James and Arktos, but the shrinking effects eventually wear off.	31 January 2004 (Germany)
7	Arktos The Good	Hoping to get information on Tabaluga's leave, Arktos tries to be nice for Nessaja's birthday party, managing unwittingly. Later though, Kayo and a giant snake crash the party, but the party proceeds.	7 February 2004 (Germany)
8	The Gloomy Forest	Tagaluga, Happy and Digby enter the Gloomy Forest in order to reach the Valley of the Winds, Arktos and James following. Tabaluga helps the lonesome living trees find company and save them from Arktos.	14 February 2004 (Germany)
9	Mother Arktos	Digby stumbles across an egg, but later James steals it. The egg hatches a crocodile and Arktos plays with it, while Tabaluga is faced with its mother's wrath, but he is able to unite the baby and mother together.	21 February 2004 (Germany)
10	Eye in the Sky	During a visit to Warren Vale, Happy and James are taken by Tempest. Arktos helps Tabaluga to ascend the mountain. Tabaluga saves the prisoners and Warren Vale, acquires the wind sign and unmasks Tempest as the rabbit Robert.	28 February 2004 (Germany)
11	Do not Forget to Remember	Tabaluga suffers a case of amnesia and Arktos takes him for a servant called Norman. Eventually, Tabaluga finds out about Arktos' deceit and gets the memory cure from Shouhou.	6 March 2004 (Germany)
12	Fool's Gold	An earthquake opens a fault. Down inside Tabaluga, Happy and Digby befriend Roly the Troll. Roly loses his treasure after Arktos fails to take it, but Roly becomes a friend to Greenland.	13 March 2004 (Germany)
13	Where is Winter?	Arktos is terminally ill, so Tabaluga travels via the river of time to the past to get a Pjorus Flower. He is hindered by a younger Arktos, but the younger Tyrion helps him.	20 March 2004 (Germany)
14	Whale of a Tale	Tabaluga travels with Happy and Digby by ship out to sea. They team up with an orca named Haratio to liberate his family from pirates in league with Arktos.	27 March 2004 (Germany)
15	Arktos' Last Gasp	TBA	3 April 2004 (Germany)
16	Troubled Waters	TBA	10 April 2004 (Germany)
17	Hidden Treasures	TBA	17 April 2004 (Germany)
18	Wish Upon a Star	TBA	24 April 2004 (Germany)
19	Who's Who	TBA	1 May 2004 (Germany)
20	The Hidden Chamber	TBA	8 May 2004 (Germany)
21	Ready, Set, Go!	TBA	15 March 2004 (Germany)
22	Digby's Promise	TBA	22 March 2004 (Germany)
23	Kayo: Friend or Foe?	TBA	29 March 2004 (Germany)
24	Menace in the Mountains	TBA	5 June 2004 (Germany)
25	Dragon World	TBA	12 June 2004 (Germany)
26	Pendant Lost	TBA	19 June 2004 (Germany)

=== Animated movie ===
Following the conclusion of the third season in 2004, a Christmas cartoon film, "Tabaluga und Leo" (engl. "Tabaluga and Leo"), based on the TV cartoon series aired in 2005, serving as a sequel to the animated series.

It is a celebration of Greenland Day for Greenland and Christmas Eve for humans. An orphaned boy named Leo who is having no luck getting a foster family decides to run away and enters a portal into Iceworld. During a search for some mountain roses to complete the Greenland festival, Tabaluga rescues Leo from Arktos and takes him to join the festival. Arktos and James intensify Leo's clumsiness in order to swipe his toy to develop a new automated weapon. The damage Leo caused to a green crystal forces Tabaluga to go on an urgent quest for a new one, Leo by his side. When Tabaluga procures the new green crystal, Arktos kidnaps Leo to complete the essential part of his new weapon. Tabaluga slips into Glasstown, rescues Leo, and returns in time to save the Greenland festival. Arktos launches his new automated weapon on Greenland, but Tabaluga and Leo repel it. Finally, Tabaluga persuades Leo to go back to his world and join his new foster parents.

=== Game Show ===
- Tabaluga tivi

=== Movie ===
- Tabaluga (2018)
