= Carsten Schmelzer =

German musician and music producer

Carsten Schmelzer (born 1964) is a German musician and music producer from Berlin.

== Biography ==
Schmelzer began to play the piano at the age of six. He took up the bass guitar at the age of 15. Carsten Schmelzer graduated from high school at the age of 18 and then turned to his career as a professional bass player.

Schmelzer took up Music Studies for a year in 1988 at the Musicians Institute, Bass Institute of Technology (BIT) in Los Angeles, graduating with Honors in 1989. He was active as a session musician and band member with Jennifer Rush, Romy Haag, the Petra Zieger Band, Rosenstolz, Klaus Renft Combo, Potsch Potschka (Spliff), Frank Diez (Peter Maffay), Jean-Jacques Kravetz (Lindenberg), der Joey Albrecht Band (Kartago), Pete Wyoming Bender, RAD, Village Voices, TrioRio and various other bands of different styles.

In 1990 Schmelzer won the Berliner Studio-Jazz Competition with the band The Visit. Since 1994, he has been working as a producer and composer, producing CDs, jingles, and music for commercials. In 2006 he composed the music for the Emmy Award-Winner Series I Got A Rocket (2008). In 2008, Schmelzer founded the production company 3Berlin together with Tobias Weyrauch and Diane Weigmann.

== Discography ==
=== Instruments and performance ===
- 1992: Klaus Gertken Trio – Someone Blind
- 1994: Klaus Gertken Trio – Insen
- 1994: Klaus Gertken Trio – Melo
- 1996: Materia (2) – No Day To Talk
- 1996: uTe kA Band* – Cosmopolitan
- 1998: Rosenstolz – Alles Gute
- 2000: Various – Ostrock In Klassik Volume II
- 2013: 3Berlin – Die Schönsten & Besten Partylieder Für Kinder
- 2014: 3Berlin – Summ, Summ, Summ (Die Beliebtesten Schlaflieder)

=== Writing & arrangement ===
- 1994: Klaus Gertken Trio – Insen (Meditation)
- 2016: Various – Neue Deutsche Kindermusik (Tanzlied)
- 2018: 3Berlin – Nicht Von Schlechten Eltern 2 (Der Allerbeste Urlaub)
- 2019: Various – KIKA Party-Hits (Ich Hab's (Erfinderlied)

== Awards ==
=== I Got A Rocket ===
- Emmy Award 2008 (Children Daytime Approaches))
- AFI Award 2007 (Best Children ́s Television Drama)
- L ́Oreal Paris Nomination 2007

=== Schmock (Short Film) ===
- Murnau Kurzfilm Award 2005

=== Muxmäuschenstill ===
- Max Ophüls Preis 2004
- Deutscher Filmpreis 2004 (Best feature film nomination)
