= Helme Heine =

German writer (1941–2025)

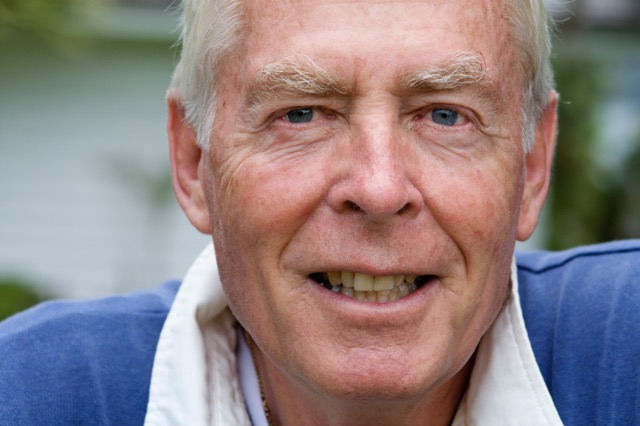
Heine in 2014

Helme Heine (4 April 1941 – 20 November 2025) was a German writer, children's book author, illustrator and designer. He lived in New Zealand, writing screenplays, audiobook scripts and creating satirical drawings and sculptures.

== Life and career ==
Helme (Helmut) Heine was born in Berlin on 4 April 1941. His parents ran different restaurants and hotels. Helme Heine was the brother of author and architect Ernst Wilhelm Heine. Among other places, he spent his childhood in Lübbecke and from 1953 in Wülfrath. When he graduated from high school in 1958, he had attended thirteen schools. As a student, he was characterised as "playful, non-conformist and with a broad artistic talent". He went on to study business and art.

Afterwards, in the early 1960s, although planned, he did not take over the parental hotel in a moated castle in Wülfrath-Düssel, an old, small village at the town boundary to Wuppertal. Instead, he traveled through Europe, Asia, and South Africa, where he settled down and worked in Johannesburg until 1977. He created a political and literary cabaret called "Sauerkraut", ran a satirical magazine, drew and worked as a director, stage designer and actor. At the beginning of the 1970s, Heine started painting.

In 1975, Helme Heine created his first children's book, "The secret of the elephant's poohs". In the same year, he met with editor Gertraud Middelhauve on the Frankfurt Book Fair, who published the book in 1976. It won an honourable mention for the "Premio Grafico" of the Bologna Children's Book Fair. The first major success followed in 1977 with "The Pigs' Wedding".

In 1977, Helme Heine pulled up stakes in South Africa and returned to Germany with his family. He later published over 50 children's books which have been translated to over 35 languages. Two of them were featured in the New York Times' "Best Illustrated Children's Books of the Year": "Mr. Miller the Dog" (1980) and "The Marvelous Journey through the Night" (1991). His most famous work is "Friends" from 1982.

Helme Heine did theater and musical work in different locations, including the 1970 World's Fair in Osaka. He created a theme park for the Hanover Zoo and had numerous expositions in Europe, the United States and Asia. In 1983, Heine created another popular children's character in the form of a little green dragon called "Tabaluga" together with Peter Maffay and Gregor Rottschalk. Different "Tabaluga" musicals have toured Germany with great success, and an en-suite production was played at Metronom Theater in Oberhausen in 1999. The Tabaluga cartoon series ran for 78 episodes and aired in 18 countries. "Sauerkraut" became the name of a children's cartoon series Heine created in 1992.

In the late 1980s, Helme Heine traveled to Ireland and went on to New Zealand. He lived and worked in Russell in the Bay of Islands together with his wife, author Gisela von Radowitz. Heine wrote novels for adults, radio and film scripts such as the film "Mollywoop" (2009), he drew and painted and designed sculptures and furniture. In his free time, Heine enjoyed sailing and fishing.

Helme Heine supported the "Stiftung Freunde" ("Friends Foundation"), a charity run by Rotary clubs in Bavaria, Saxony and Austria, named after his most famous book. The foundation is aimed at teaching life skills to young children and preventing violence and addictions.

As an author and illustrator, Helme Heine won numerous national and international prizes, including the European children's book award.

Heine died in Russell, New Zealand on 20 November 2025, at the age of 84.

== Bibliography ==
=== Children's books (selection) ===
- Saturday in Paradise
- The Secret of the Elephant's Poohs ISBN 3-407-77068-5
- Prince Bear
- Friends ISBN 978-0-689-71083-4
- King Hop the First
- The Most Beautiful Egg in the World ISBN 3-407-77061-8
- The Pigs' Wedding
- Mollywoop ISBN 978-0-374-35001-7
- Tabaluga
- The Hare With the Red Nose ISBN 3-407-77006-5
- The Club ISBN 3-407-77023-5
- Foxtrot ISBN 3-446-20306-0
- Friends Go Adventuring ISBN 978-0-689-81850-9
- The Pearl ISBN 978-0-689-71262-3

=== Books on Helme Heine and his works ===
- Karola Kimmerle: Die Freunde von Helme Heine. Ridinghaus (2001). ISBN 3-7421-3500-7
- Maren Saam: Literatur-Werkstatt zum Kinderbuch von Helme Heine "Freunde". Verlag an der Ruhr (2004). ISBN 3-86072-907-1
- Gisela von Radowitz: Traum und Wirklichkeit – Helme Heine, ein Portrait. Beltz & Gelberg (2012). ISBN 3407820232
