= Krawiec =

Krawiec (Polish pronunciation: [ˈkravʲɛt͡s]) is a Polish surname meaning "tailor". Males and females use the same form in modern Poland. The surname is related to Kravets, Kravec, and Kravitz/Krawitz.

Language	Masculine	Feminine
Polish	Krawiec	
Russian (Romanization)	Кравец (Kravyets, Kraviets, Kravets)	
Slovak	Kravec	Kravcová
Ukrainian (Romanization)	Кравець (Kravets, Kravec)(Kravetz)	
Other	Krawietz, Krawitz, Kravietz, Kravitz Kravetz	

== People ==
- Ed Krawiec (born 1976), American motorcycle racer
- Jan Krawiec (1919–2020), Polish-American journalist
- Joyce Krawiec (born 1945), American politician
- Ken Kravec (born 1951), American baseball player
- Kevin Krawietz, German tennis player
- Richard Krawiec (born 1952), American writer
