= Faith In What? =

1996 novel by Richard Krawiec

- First edition
- Author: Richard Krawiec
- Language: English
- Genre: Novel, Proletarian literature
- Publisher: Avisson Press, Inc.
- Publication date: 1996
- Publication place: United States
- Media type: Print (hardback)
- Pages: 174 pp
- ISBN: 1-888105-05-4
- OCLC: 34635015
- Dewey Decimal: 813/.54 20
- LC Class: PS3561.R33 F45 1996

Faith In What? is a novel by the American writer Richard Krawiec set in 1980s Pittsburgh, Pennsylvania. According to Kirkus Review, it is a "gritty, powerful second novel."

It tells the story of a working-class family, Tim and Pat and their two daughters, struggling with illness and unemployment in the wake of the dramatic collapse of the steel industry.

== See also ==
Time Sharing
