= Frumpy 2 =

Album by Frumpy

Studio album by Frumpy
- Released: August 1971
- Genres: Progressive rock Krautrock; Psychedelic rock
- Length: 38:37
- Labels: Philips; Reissue on CD by Repertoire records
- Producer: Rainer Goltermann

Frumpy chronology
All Will Be Changed (1970)	Frumpy 2 (1971)	By The Way (1972)

Professional ratings
Review scores
Source	Rating
Allmusic	4/5 stars

Frumpy 2 was the second album by the German progressive rock band Frumpy. It was released in 1971.

== Track listing ==
Tracks on the original release of the album were:

=== Side one ===
1. "Good Winds" (Rumpf) – 10:02
2. "How the Gypsy Was Born" (Kravetz/Rumpf) – 8:49

=== Side two ===
1. "Take Care of Illusion" (Kravetz/Rumpf) – 7:30
2. "Duty" (Kravetz/Rumpf) – 12:09

== Personnel ==
- Rainer Baumann – guitar
- Carsten Bohn – drums
- Karl-Heinz Schott – bass
- Jean-Jacques Kravetz – keyboards
- Inga Rumpf – vocals
