= Carsten Bohn =

German drummer and composer

- Also known as: CeBee, Bert Brac
- Born: 18 August 1948 (age 78); Hamburg, Germany
- Genres: Krautrock, Rock and roll
- Occupations: Musician, composer
- Years active: 1970 – present
- Label: BigNoteRecords
- Website: Big Note Records

Carsten Bohn (born 18 August 1948) is a German drummer and composer. He was the drummer for the German progressive rock band Frumpy from 1969 to 1972 and had a long career in the German music scene.

He has recorded with Peter Baumann (ex-Tangerine Dream) and played as Drummer with the Jan Hammer Band

== Radio play music ==
From 1979 to 1983, Carsten Bohn composed 98 pieces of music for the Miller-International label Europa, of which 78 compositions were used in their well-known radio play series (Famous Five, TKKG, The Three Investigators, H. G. Francis' The Horror Series [neon-colored], Larry Brent, Macabros, Flash Gordon, Edgar Wallace, The Funk Foxes, Pizza Gang, among others). Carsten Bohn sings the title song of the Famous Five radio play series ("We are the five friends - Julian and Dick, Anne and George, and Timmy the dog ...").

In 1986, it was researched that Carsten Bohn's music is heard on 172 radio plays by Europa (a total of 2006 sequences with an average of 3:38 minutes per episode).

In 2008, Carsten Bohn exclusively composed new radio play music for the radio play label canora media and their adaptation of the pulp novel series Professor Zamorra from the Bastei-Verlag publishing house.

Legal dispute with BMG-Miller

The music pieces were published by Europa at the time under the pseudonym Bert Brac, among others, created by Miller International. Other collective pseudonyms created by Miller International are Ralph Bonda, Phil Moss, and Betty George. These pseudonyms were also used by Heikedine Körting and Andreas E. Beurmann.

Since 1988, Carsten Bohn and Sony BMG as the successor to the record company Miller International have been in dispute in court over royalties and copyrights. Neither Bohn nor Sony BMG are allowed to use the old music recordings during the ongoing proceedings. Since then, the affected episodes, with the old mixes of the radio plays, have been replaced by new mixes with music pieces by other musicians. This affects, for example, The Three Investigators episodes 1 to 39, and TKKG episodes 1 to 33.

For this reason, the original cassettes or records with the old music mixes have become partly valuable collector's items, especially the 1982 release episode 29 from The Three Investigators series (catalog no. 115 929.1 (LP) and 515 929.6 (MC)) and episode 15 Horror Pop Sounds from the neon-colored H. G. Francis Horror series.

The Famous Five theme song was sold as a product including all exploitation rights and is therefore still used today.

== Biography ==
Already in his youth he performed at Hamburg's legendary Star-Club (where the Beatles started out), acting as the drummer in a variety of bands that gained a measure of local popularity. His breakthrough in Europe came in 1970 with Frumpy.

The funky lounge sound of Carsten Bohn's soundtrack music for children's audio story books from the 1970s and 1980s has long been a hit in Germany. Between 1970 and 1972, Carsten Bohn was the leader and drummer of Frumpy, the German "Kraut Rock" band headlined by the Hamburg-born blues singer Inga Rumpf.

Bohn was already a fixture in the German music business when, as BERT BRAC, he began composing music for audio story books. The music accompanying the audiobooks became just as popular as the stories themselves. Bohn's work was concentrated on multiple audio book series in which he left his own mark with his music.

The record labels responsible for the audio books, without Bohn's knowledge or permission, used his work to accompany the story telling in at least 16 audio book series totalling approximately 170 individual episodes. Bohn engaged Europa Records in a legal battle for copyright infringement that continues today, with the result that neither the record label nor Bohn were allowed to publish the original music used for the audio books. The publishers of the old audio books had to re-record them with new music not composed by Bohn. This resulted in a full-blown run by fans on the early editions of Bohn's vinyl recordings. Special editions from that time, featuring full-length versions of Bohn's music, are sought-after collector's items. In Germany, the original vinyl LP of some of his recordings can command very high prices, in the region of $US 250. In addition, communities of fans took the trouble to remaster the new audio books, replacing "alien music" with songs from Bohn's older creations, and distributed them in a private pool.

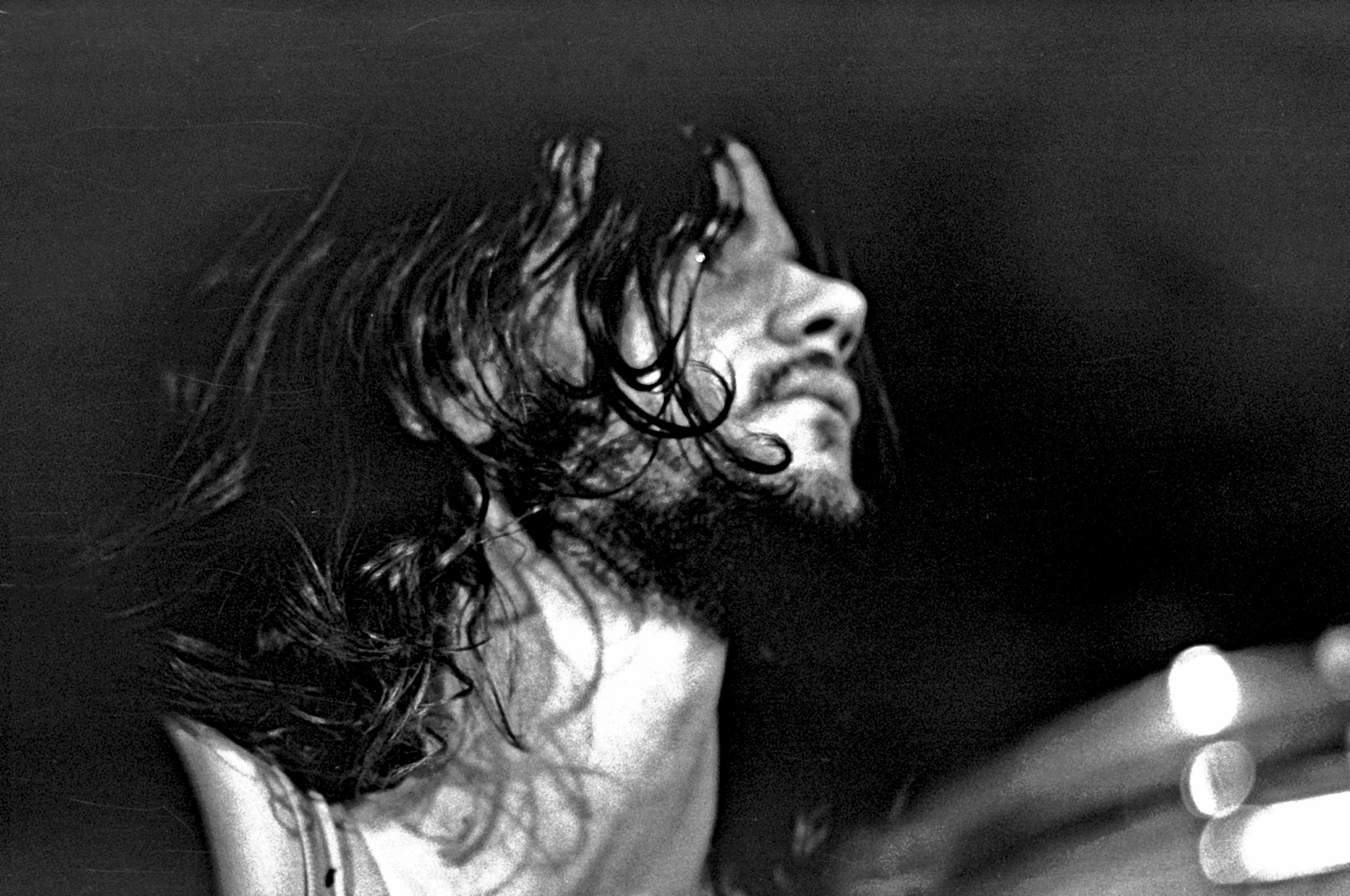
Carsten Bohn performing with the band Frumpy in Hamburg, in 1971

In 1973, Bohn formed the group Dennis, named after his son born in 1971

Between 1977–1981 Bohn formed Carsten Bohn's Bandstand and recorded 3 LP's with different lineups. He was member (drummer) of the Jan Hammer Band between 1982 and 1983 along with Colin Hodgkinson and Jack Bruce, touring the US and Europe.

Bohn has attempted twice to reform Frumpy, once in 1976, and once in 1989. The 1989 revival resulted in the release of two studio albums, and a live album in 1995.

In 2004, Bohn and his band, Carsten Bohn's Bandstand, re-recorded the audio book music released by his own BigNoteRecords label, for re-release. Vol. I & II of a planned CD trilogy series were issued in 2004 and 2005 respectively. The songs therein feature Bohn's signature lounge beat which enjoy cult status among followers. For these re-recordings, the same instruments and equipment used to make the original recordings were used in order to replicate the original 1970s' and 1980s' recorded performances as closely as possible.

Carsten Bohn now composes and records music for films.

== Discography ==
=== Frumpy ===
- All will be changed, 1970
- Frumpy 2, 1971
- By the Way, 1972
- Frumpy LIVE, 1973
- Now!, 1990
- News, 1991
- Frumpy (live '95), 1995

=== Other projects ===
- Zabba Lindner - Vollbedienung of Percussion, 1973
- Dennis - Hyperthalamus, 1973
- A.R.Machine - A.R.4, 1974
- Kickbit Information - Bitkicks, 1975
- P. Baumann - Repeat Repeat, 1981
- Georgie Red - We'll Work It Out, 1986
- Georgie Red - Helpless Dancer, 1987
- Udo Lindenberg - Atlantic Affairs 2001

=== Carsten Bohn's Bandstand ===
- Humor Rumor, 1977
- Mother Goes Shoes, 1978
- C.B. Radio, 1979
- New York Times, (Solo), 1993
- Brandnew Oldies Vol.1, 2004
- Brandnew Oldies Vol. 2, 2005
- Brandnew Oldies LIVE - Limited Fan-Edition (DVD), 2006
- Brandnew Oldies LIVE, Hamburg, 02.10.04 (DVD+CD), 2006
- Brandnew Oldies Vol. 3, 2009
- Brandnew Oldies Vol. 4, 2018

== Awards ==
On October 31, 2009, Carsten Bohn was awarded 62 gold records and 4 platinum records at once for his composed radio play music from the 1970s and 1980s for the Europa label.  This has never happened in this form in Germany before.

* The three ???
** 29× Gold
** 3× Platinum
* TKKG
** 19× Gold
** 1× Platinum
* Five friends
** 13× Gold
