= Johnny Tame =

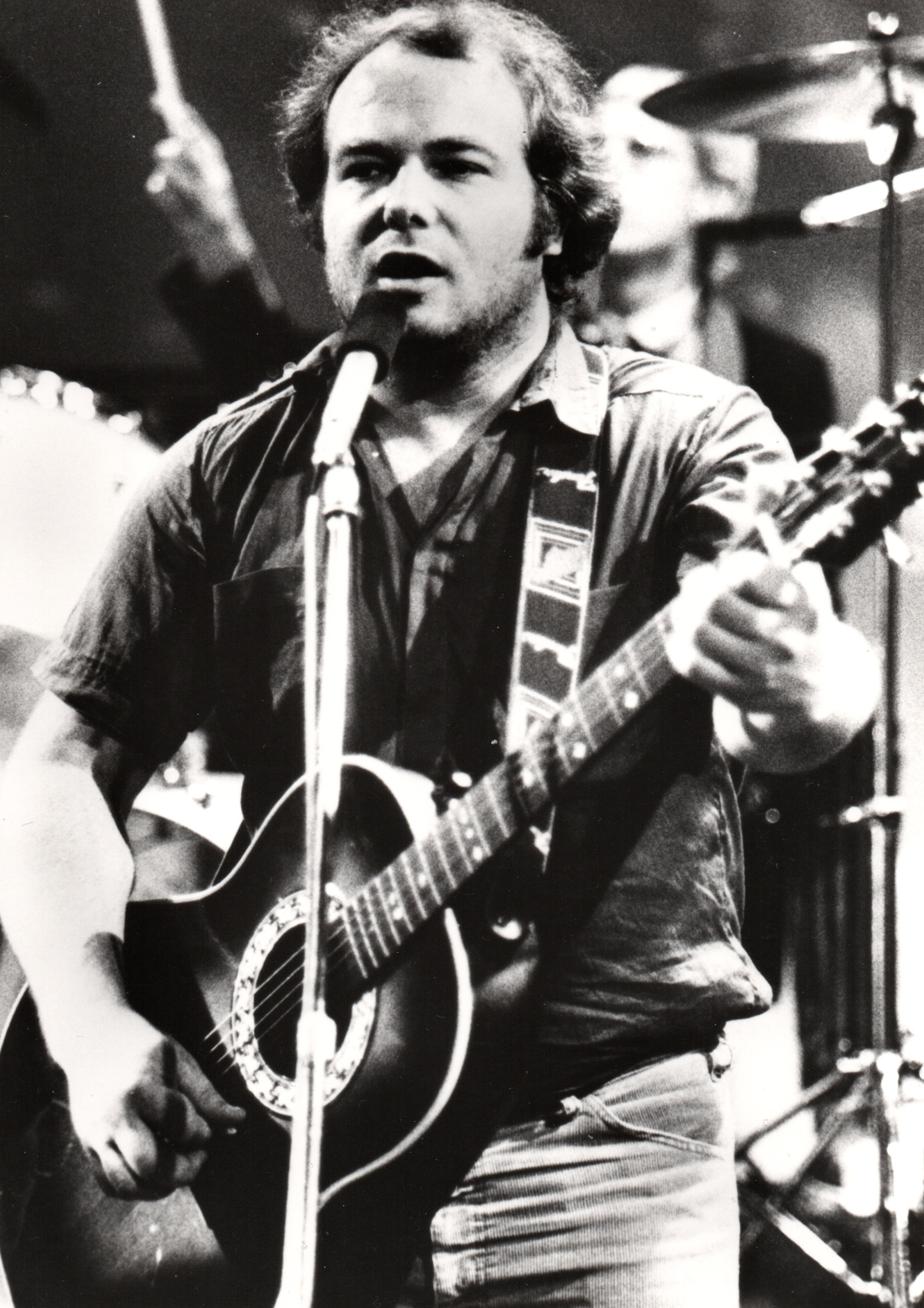
- Johnny Tame 1986

Background information
- Born: Uwe Reuß; 3 March 1947; Friedberg/Hessen, Germany
- Died: March 2022 Hamburg, Germany
- Genres: Rock, country music, folk music
- Occupations: Songwriter, musician, music producer
- Instruments: Guitar, bass guitar, vocals
- Years active: 1963–1989
- Labels: BMG Ariola, Teldec, Fontana Records
- Website: johnnytame.de

Uwe Reuß (born 3 March 1947, Friedberg/Hessen, died March 2022 Hamburg), known as Johnny Tame, was a German singer-songwriter and guitarist. He started his musical career in the early 1960s and gained remarkable national and international success as soloist as well as member of different bands. His longtime cooperation and partnership with famous German rock singer Peter Maffay kept raising his popularity which he would campaign for social and humanitarian activities. Due to health problems he retired from the music business in 1989.

Tame was married and lived in Hamburg, Germany, until his passing March 2022.

== Musical career ==
Tame started his musical career in the early 1960s yet under his common name, Uwe Reuß. He performed as bassist, guitarist and singer in different German bands such as The Rascals (not to be mixed up with US-American Pop-Band The Rascals), The Gigolos and The Delegates. In 1964 he decided to make a living as a professional and gained attention in numerous Galas und TV-Shows, also in foreign German-speaking countries. Since 1967 he carried on using a pseudonym, Johnny Tame, and reached his biggest international success with his song "Sand in my Shoes". Tame played numerous festivals and was German representative at the Maltese Song-Festival "OSCAR" in 1968 where he finished third. The same year he contributed as singer on two songs of a Perry Rhodan movie using the pseudonym Sherman Space.

By entering the 1970s international concert, TV and radio shows in United States, Portugal, Belgium and Scandinavia increased. Tame formed the Johnny Tame's Time Machine in 1972 and was bassist and singer of the band Bourbon Family. Moreover, he played with the Orpheus Band of Schlagersinger Costa Cordalis until 1976. Though media- and stage-appearance got more and more, the crucial breakthrough would not succeed.

=== Tame and Maffay ===
Tame had a very successful collaboration starting in 1976 with famous German Rock Singer Peter Maffay. As duo Tame & Maffay they produced two Country Rock albums. Moreover, Tame more or less went to be a constant guest at Maffay's studio- and live-productions until 1985 what finally earned Tame the long-awaited economic success. His overall album-sales gained multiple gold, platinum and diamond certifications. After all his deep disinterest in financial matters led to a subsequent monetary disaster.

Lasting problems during live and studio work due to Alcohol and Hashish consume have been spread as the main reasons for breaking up the cooperation in 1984. Only years later the public – and even Tame himself – came to know, that he was suffering from chronic fatigue syndrome. His last production took place in 1986. He quit playing music and sealed himself off from any kind of public appearance. In 1989 he left his residence on East Frisian Island Borkum only for receiving the award "Artist of the year in Niedersachsen", a small city event in Northeim and a five-day-open-air festival in Bremen – The Breminale.

== Social commitment ==
Tame already used his popularity in an early stage of his career in order to support social and humanitarian projects as well as ecology groups. He broached the issues of air pollution, forest dieback or the use of nuclear energy – sometimes radically – long before those problems where picked out as a central theme in Germany and elsewhere. He played concerts with Joan Baez for Amnesty International and Humanitas in the early 1980s, also at the Concert for Afghanistan in Hamburg. He constantly supported Greenpeace and the German groups and initiatives Künstler für den Frieden, AGA Aktionsgemeinschaft Artenschutz and Nicaragua-Foundation of Dietmar Schönherr.

== Discography ==
Between 1965 und 1986 there has been a couple of musical publications with and by Johnny Tame, both in German and English language. Musical support usually was contributed by members of "Peter Maffay Band". The so far last release was a "Best of...." album produced by his long time friend and bandmate Frank Diez.

Singles

- 1965

The Delegates – Monkey Monkey / She's the one

- 1966

Gary and the Gamblers – Schöne Träume / Man redet soviel
The Delegates – Walking in my sleep all night / Nitewalk

- 1967

Johnny Tame – Sand in my shoes / Steak and cake
Johnny Tame – A lonely stretch of nothing / Yesterday is a thousand tears away

- 1968

Johnny Tame – Agatha Twichit / Ich geh’ meinen Weg
Johnny Tame – Der einsame Mr. Brown / Unter jedem Himmel
Johnny Tame – Honey Honey / Please let them be
als "Sherman Space" – Count Down / Omicron 3

- 1969

Johnny Tame – Walter / Please let them be
Johnny Tame – Schachmatt / Walking in my sleep allnight
Archaeopterix – Barbarella / Samstag abend, Sonntag morgen
Archaeopterix – Barbarella / No more living without loving

- 1970

Johnny Tame – You’ve guessed / Walking in my sleep allnight
Johnny Tame – Sunny Honey Girl / Guitarman
J & M – Ich sing’ für Dich / Alle reden von Liebe

- 1971

Bourbon Family – Allright okay / Oochee Boochee

- 1972

Bourbon Family – Shambala / I’ve got a tiger by the tail

- 1977

Tame & Maffay – Making it better / I can be so far away

- 1979

Tame & Maffay – Victory / Stop feeling blue

- 1980

Johnny Tame – Louisiana / I’m not gonna waste my time
Johnny Tame – I’m stranded / Here in this land

- 1981

Johnny Tame – Time for peace / Rescue

EPs

- 1982

Tame & Maffay – You won't be hurt again

Album

- 1977

Tame & Maffay – Tame & Maffay I

- 1979

Tame & Maffay – Tame & Maffay II

- 1980

Johnny Tame – Indistinct horizon

- 1981

Johnny Tame – Untamed

CDs

- 1998

Johnny Tame – Johnny Tame (Best of)

Collaboration

- 1976

Peter Maffay – Es war Sommer (Ich such’ meinen Stern)

- 1977

Peter Maffay – Dein Gesicht

- 1978

Peter Maffay – Live

- 1979

Peter Maffay – Steppenwolf

- 1980

Peter Maffay – Revanche
Volker Lechtenbrink – Dame & Clown (Jet Set, Meine kleine Schwester)

- 1982

Peter Maffay – Live 82
Peter Maffay – Ich will leben

- 1986

Double V Connection – UnderTaKing

== Awards ==
- 1980 Artist of the year – Pop National by Deutsche Phonoakademie
- 1980 German Record Award by Deutsche Phonoakademie for the album Tame & Maffay II
