= Alexis (singer) =

German pop and gala singer

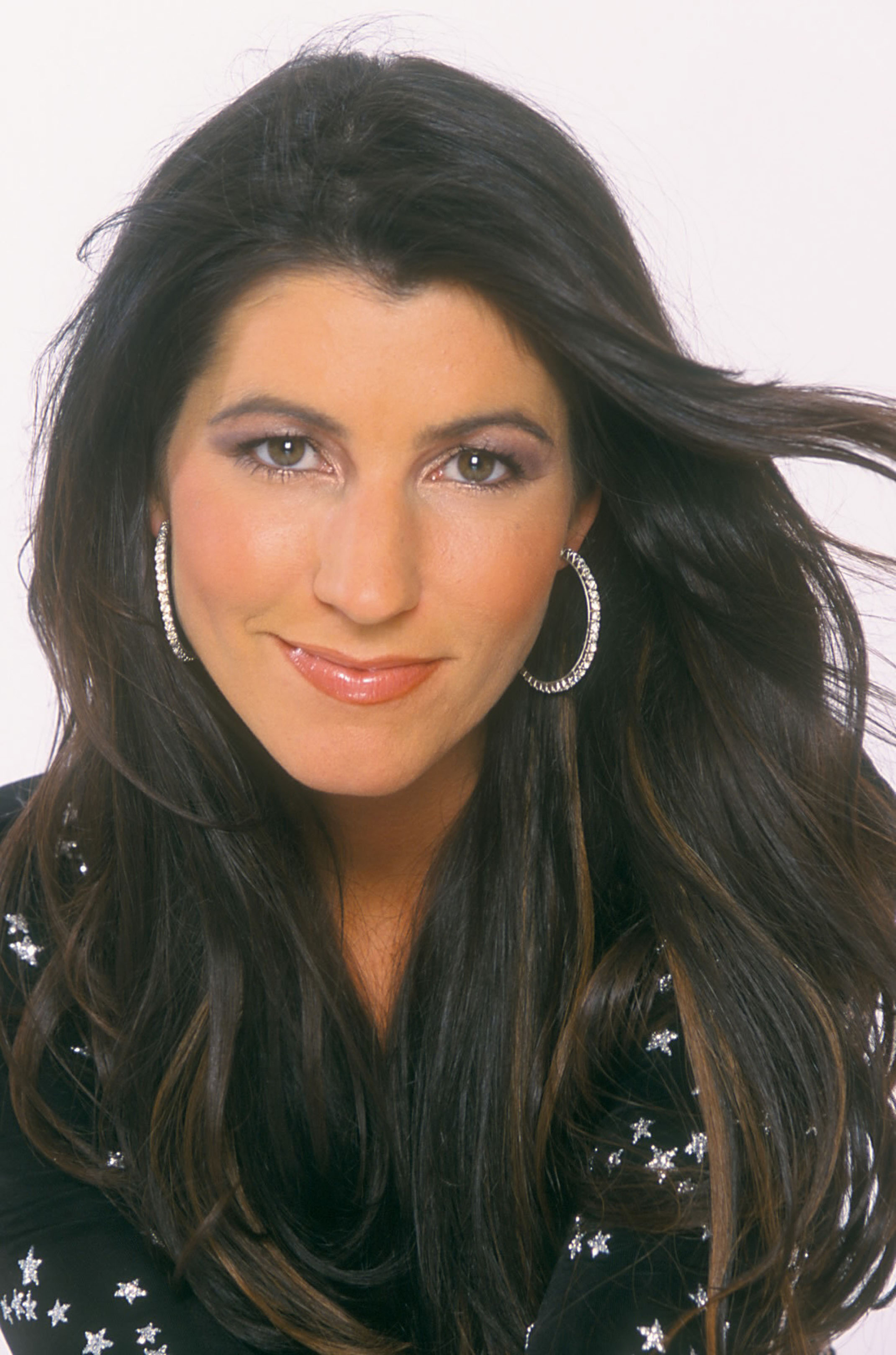

Background information
- Origin: Germany
- Genres: Pop music
- Years active: 1986–present
- Labels: Idee Tontr. (1986–1987); Sony Records (1990–1991); Edel Music (1992–1993); BMG (1993–1994)

Alexis (born 2 December 1960) is a German pop and gala singer. She is mainly known for participating in the German "Rudi Carrell Show" (a show similar to "Star Search" or "Pop Idol") in 1989, singing Whitney Houston's song "One Moment In Time" (which brought her a major record deal with Sony Records). She later sang the female lead role on the German Top 10 album "Tabaluga & Lilli" (a conceptual pop record for children, concerning Tabaluga) and later toured Germany with the musical "Tabaluga & Lilli".

== Biography ==
Alexis studied at the German "Stage School of Dance and Drama" from 1986 – 1989.

As a teenager she released her first single, called "Do You Really Want Me," which was produced by Dieter Bohlen's co-producer Luis Rodriguez (Modern Talking, C. C. Catch) and turned into a small club hit in Germany in 1986. A second less successful single followed one year later.

On 21 January 1989, Alexis performed her rendition of Whitney Houston's "One Moment In Time" on the German Rudi Carrell TV show (which had 24 million viewers that night). The "Rudi Carrell Show" was similar to concepts such as "Star Search" or "Pop Idol" and people who performed on that show gained a lot of media attention.

Alexis received offers for a record deal from basically all German record labels, including Sony Records, BMG, Polydor, etc. Alexis chose an exclusive deal with CBS Records (which is a division of Sony Records these days) and began working on her first solo album.

Her first album, simply entitled "Alexis" was released in early 1990. It was produced by Harold Faltermeyer (who wrote the soundtrack for the blockbuster movie "Beverly Hills Cop"), and Gunter Mende & Candy Derouge (who have written songs for Celine Dion and Lory Bianco). Among the songwriters were the German duo Klarmann/Weber (who have already written songs performed by La Toya Jackson or Chaka Khan).

Alexis promoted her debut album on more than 20 prime-time TV shows and she was nominated for the German award "Goldene Europa." Another single, produced by Ralf-René Maué (Samantha Fox) followed in autumn 1990. This, however, was the end of Alexis's collaboration with CBS Records due Sony Records taking over the company in Germany.

In 1992, she released her first single in the German language called "Du Hast So Viel In Dir," which was also the theme of a TV commercial for Granini fruit juice. In the same year she won the annual MMS Music Festival in Portoroz, Slovenia.

In 1993, she was hired by one of Germany's top-selling rock artists, Peter Maffay for his legendary rock musical "Tabaluga" and offered her the part of the female lead role, Lilli. Their duet single "Ich Fühl Wie Du" entered the German Top 100 and the album remained in the Top 10 for three consecutive months.

The musical "Tabaluga and Lilli" went on tour and they did almost 100 shows in the biggest halls of Germany, such as Munich, Berlin or Dortmund. At the end of the year the musical was broadcast on German television.

Alexis recorded two songs for the new Willy Bogner film "White Magic" and worked with Harold Faltermeyer again.

In 1996, she released a single, entitled "Empire of the Champ" (co-written by Alexis), which was her most successful solo hit. Alexis wrote the song for the boxing match between Darius Michalczewski and Rocky Graciano. Vitali Klitschko later used the song as his theme song whenever he did boxing matches.

Alexis has often made guest appearances on other artist's music projects, such as singing on the cover version of Yes` "Owner of A Lonely Heart" for a new dance project called 2 Ruff (the song entered the German Top 100 and peaked at #66). She also worked twice with Edward Simoni.

Alexis lives in Hamburg, Germany and works as a full-time singer.

== Discography ==
=== Singles ===
- 1986: Do You Really Want Me
- 1987: First Night of Love
- 1990: Prisoner of Love
- 1990: Close to Heaven
- 1990: Lying Eyes
- 1992: Du hast so viel in dir
- 1993: Ich fühl wie du (duet with Peter Maffay)
- 1996: Empire of the Champ
- 1997: Where Are You?
- 1999: Eine ferne Melodie (with Edward Simoni)

=== Albums ===
- 1990: Alexis
- 1999: Eine ferne Melodie (Edward Simoni feat. Alexis)
- 2004: Schwerelos geborgen (Edward Simoni feat. Alexis)

=== Other projects ===
- 1993: Tabaluga & Lilli (album by Peter Maffay) – 1 duet song
- 1994: Tabaluga & Lilli (live CD) – 2 titles "Ich fühl wie du"
- 1994: White Magic (soundtrack) – 1 title "Crystal Dreams"
- 1998: 2 Ruff feat. Alexis (single) – "Owner of a Lonely Heart"
- 2000: Harry Calahan feat. Alexis (vinyl DJ maxi) – "Return to the Funk"
