= Steppenwolf (Peter Maffay album) =

1979 studio album by Peter Maffay

Studio album by Peter Maffay
- Released: 1979
- Recorded: January–March 1979
- Studio: Hansa Tonstudio, West Berlin
- Genre: Pop rock
- Length: 48:22
- Label: Telefunken
- Producer: Peter Maffay; Peter Wagner

Peter Maffay chronology
Live (1978)	Steppenwolf (1979)	Revanche (1980)

Singles from Steppenwolf
- 1. "So bist du" Released: March 1979; 2. "Du hattest keine Tränen mehr" Released: September 1979

Steppenwolf is an album of rock music produced and played by Peter Maffay, which was recorded in Germany and went on sale in 1979. It contains parts of his early work, and some of the music he recorded and played with peace activists / singers such as Donovan. The album topped the charts in Germany, staying there for 9 weeks and continued charting for over a year. The single, "So bist du", also hit No. 1, doing so for three weeks.

== Track listing ==
Side one
No.	Title	Writer(s)	Length
1.	"So nicht"	Bernd Meinunger	3:34
2.	"Steppenwolf"	Oliver Spiecker	3:33
3.	"Auf dem Weg zu mir"	Meinunger	4:23
4.	"Jane"	Meinunger	3:57
5.	"Mach's gut, mein Freund"	Volker Lechtenbrink	3:25
6.	"Du hattest keine Tränen mehr"	Lechtenbrink	5:13
Total length:			24:05

Side two
No.	Title	Writer(s)	Length
1.	"So bist du"	Meinunger	5:07
2.	"Spuren einer Nacht"	Meinunger	5:02
3.	"Roadie"	Meinunger	4:06
4.	"Das ist mein Traum"	Lechtenbrink	3:14
5.	"Liebling, wach auf"	Lechtenbrink	3:38
6.	"Wahrheit"	Lechtenbrink	3:10
Total length:			24:17

== Charts ==
=== Weekly charts ===
Chart (1979)	Peak position
German Albums (Offizielle Top 100)	1

=== Year-end charts ===
Chart (1979)	Position
German Albums (Offizielle Top 100)	6
Chart (1980)	Position
German Albums (Offizielle Top 100)	20

== Certifications and sales ==
Region	Certification	Certified units/sales
Germany (BVMI)	Platinum	500,000^{^}
^{^} Shipments figures based on certification alone.
