= Tabaluga (film) =

- German theatrical release poster
- Directed by: Sven Unterwaldt Jr.
- Written by: Jeffrey Hylton; Joe Vitale
- Based on: Tabaluga by Peter Maffay
- Produced by: Solveig Fina; Helge Sasse
- Starring: Wincent Weiss; Michael Herbig; Yvonne Catterfeld
- Edited by: Nana Novosad
- Music by: Peter Hinderthür
- Production companies: Deutsche Columbia Pictures Filmproduktion; Tempest Film
- Distributed by: Sony Pictures Releasing International
- Release date: 6 December 2018
- Running time: 90 minutes
- Country: Germany
- Language: German

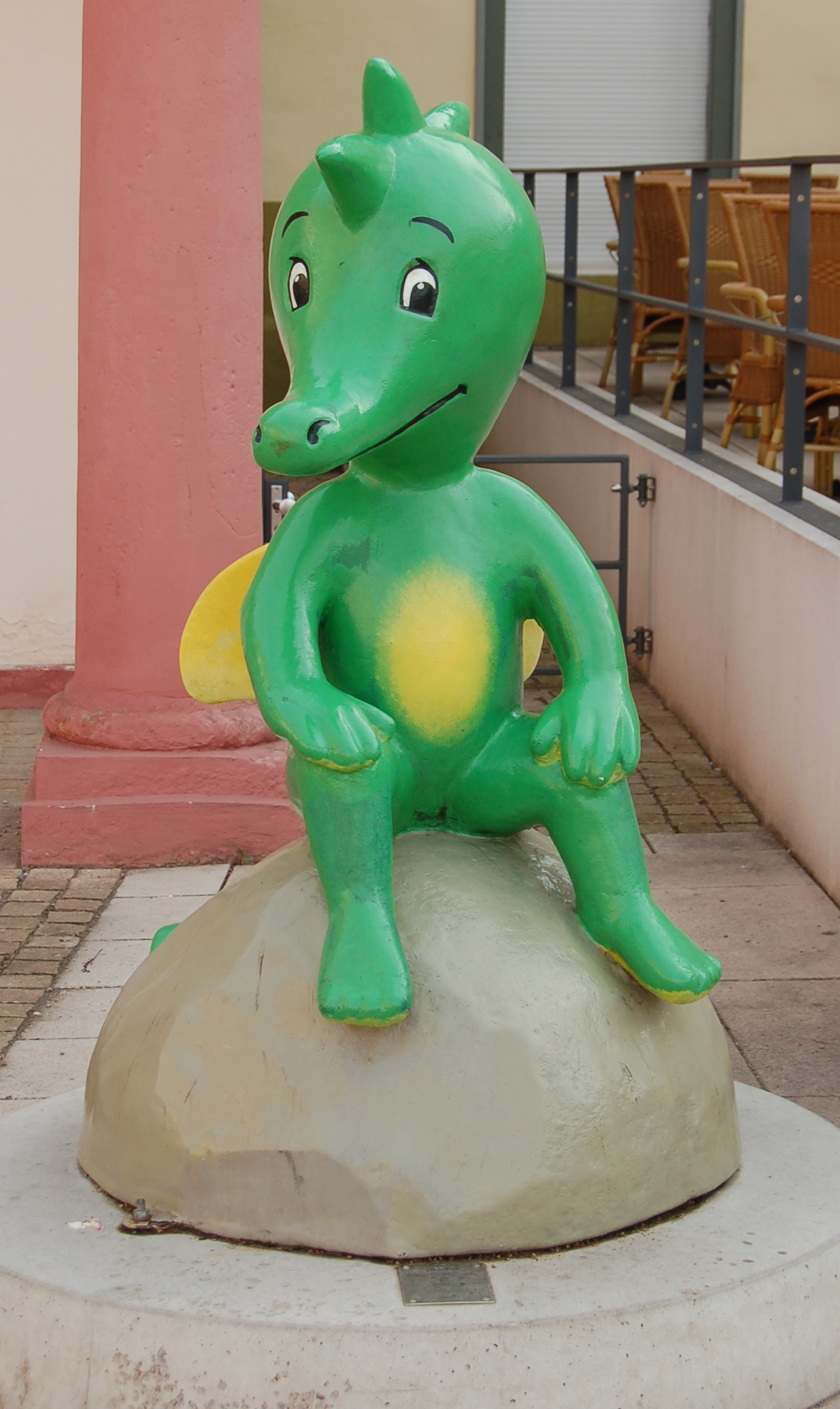
Statue of Tabaluga in Erfurt, Germany

Tabaluga (also known as Tabaluga & Lilli) is a 2018 German animated fantasy musical family film directed by Sven Unterwaldt Jr. and starring Wincent Weiss in the title role. The film is based on the media franchise of the same name created by German Rock musician Peter Maffay. An American version, released in November 2019 on DirecTV and in theaters and on VOD in December 2019, starring Mackenzie Ziegler, was renamed Ice Princess Lily. In the United Kingdom, it was released as The Ice Princess in 2019. The story follows a young dragon, Tabaluga, who teams up with an ice princess, Lilli, to save the world from the evil snowman, Arktos. The German version received mixed-to-positive reviews while the English version received negative reviews.

== Synopsis ==
Tabaluga, the last dragon on Earth, is growing up in lush Greenland. While searching for his dragon fire, he meets a beautiful ice princess, Lilli, from frozen Iceland. The inhabitants of the two lands are highly suspicious of each other, but Tabaluga and Lilli are surprised to find out that the prejudices are wrong, and they like each other.

Lilli takes Tabaluga to see Arktos, the ruler of Iceland, not knowing that Arktos has frozen all the dragons and killed Tabaluga's parents. Arktos tries to kill Tabaluga with his magical ice powers, but Lilli and her polar bear friend Limbo help him to escape and go with him to Greenland.

Tabaluga and Lilli begin a romance. Arktos sends an army to invade Greenland. Tabaluga's old raven guardian, Kolk, advises him to visit the wise Nessaja in the swamps, who tells him that his fire was always in his heart, though the dragon does not believe her at first. Lilli returns to Iceland to try to inspire a popular uprising against Arktos, but he captures her and then traps Tabaluga, who follows her.

When Arktos moves to kill Lilli, Tabaluga finds his fire and fights against Arktos's ice powers. Lilli steals Arktos's hat, which blinds Arktos (since his eyes are on his hat), and Tabaluga is able to melt Arktos to a tiny size; Arktos flees while vowing revenge. Tabaluga and Lilli fall in love and the Icelanders and Greenlanders become friends.

== Voice cast ==
=== German voice cast ===
- Wincent Weiss as Tabaluga
- Michael Herbig as Glückskäfer Bully, Tabaluga's ladybug friend
- Heinz Hoenig as Arktos
- Yvonne Catterfeld as Eisprinzessin Lilli (Princess Lilli)
- Rick Kavanian as Eisbär Limbo, Lilli's polar bear friend
- Katharina Thalbach as Nessaja, the wise turtle

=== English voice cast ===
- Cameron Ansell as Tabaluga
- Mackenzie Ziegler as Lily (American version)
- Kristin Fairlie as Lilli (International version)
- Benedict Campbell as Arktos
- Dan Petronijevic as Limbo
- Elizabeth Hanna as Nessaja / Swift
- Ellen-Ray Hennessy as Mythia / Beaver / Ice Lady Bug
- Kevin Dennis as Bully / Snow Kid Rabbit / Male Rabbit
- Richard Waugh as Kolk / Polar Bear / Snowkid Rabbit / Male Rabbit
- Rick Miller as Mirmel / Tyrion / Narrator
- Zach Bennett as Emra / Frog
