= Frumpy =

German krautrock band

- Origin: Hamburg, Germany
- Genres: Progressive rock Acid rock Blues rock Krautrock
- Years active: 1970–1972, 1990–1995
- Label: Philips
- Past members: Inga Rumpf; Jean-Jacques Kravetz; Rainer Baumann; Karl-Heinz Schott; Carsten Bohn; Erwin Kama; Thomas (Carola) Kretschmer

Frumpy was a German progressive rock/krautrock band based in Hamburg, which was active from 1970–1972 and 1990–1995. Formed after the break-up of folk rockers City Preachers, Frumpy released four albums in 1970–1973 and achieved considerable commercial success. The German press hailed them as the best German rock band of their time and their vocalist Inga Rumpf as the "greatest individual vocal talent" of the contemporary German rock scene. They disbanded in 1972 although the various members all worked together at various times over the following two decades and they reunited again in 1989, producing three more albums over five years after which they disbanded once more.

== Formation ==
All of the band members met as performers with Germany's first folk rock band City Preachers, formed by Irishman John O'Brien-Docker in Hamburg in 1965. In 1968, the band had split, with O'Brien-Docker and several other members parting company. Singer Inga Rumpf, a distinctive "un-feminine" sounding vocalist often compared favourably with Janis Joplin, continued to use the band name with a line-up including drummer Udo Lindenberg, singer Dagmar Krause, French organist Jean-Jacques Kravetz and bassist Karl-Heinz Schott. In the spring of 1969, Lindenberg left to pursue a solo career and was replaced by Carsten Bohn, who by November that year had grown disappointed with Krause and called for the band to pursue a new creative direction, "a fusion of rock, blues, classical, folk and psychedelic."

Reforming in March 1970 as Frumpy (a play on Rumpf's surname inspired by seeing the word "frumpy" in a CBS record catalogue) the new line-up of Rumpf, Bohn, Kravetz and Schott debuted at the Essen International Pop & Blues Festival in April 1970, where two of their songs "Duty" and "Floating" were recorded and released on the live compilation album Pop & Blues Festival '70. This was followed by more tour dates in France, Germany and the Netherlands, an appearance at the Kiel Progressive Pop Festival in July 1970, and at the Open Air Love & Peace Festival at Fehmarn, 6 September 1970.

== Recordings ==
They recorded their debut album All Will Be Changed in August 1970. To promote the album the band embarked on a fifty-night German tour with Spooky Tooth, as well as playing supporting slots with Yes, Humble Pie and Renaissance. The album received both critical acclaim and commercial success.

Initially the band played without a guitarist, which was unusual in the rock genre, instead making great use of Kravetz's "spacey organ excursions" and his powerful Leslie Rotating Speaker System, a sound modification and frequency modulation device. Rumpf said: "In the beginning we were happy enough as a quartet. I played and composed exclusively on an acoustic guitar. It was only later that we began to write songs that called for a guitar." In 1971, just before the band started recording their second album, called simply 2, they recruited former Sphinx Tush guitarist Rainer Baumann to the line-up. The album, "heavier and more mature progressive rock with classical overtones in Kravetz's organ ([and] occasionally mellotron) work," repeated the success of the first, and gave the band a hit single with "How the Gipsy Was Born", which would become their "signature tune." The German music magazine Musikexpress dubbed Frumpy as the best German rock act of the year, while Inga Rumpf, variously described as "smoky", "demonic" and "roaring," was declared by national newspaper Frankfurter Allgemeine Zeitung to be the "greatest individual vocal talent" of the German rock scene so far.

Due to "musical differences" Kravetz left the band in early 1972 to work with Lindenberg and his Das Panik Orchester and also to record a solo album, Kravetz (1972), which featured both Rumpf and Lindenberg. He was replaced in Frumpy by Erwin Kania, who had previously played in Murphy Blend, and Kania appears on several of the tracks on Frumpy's third album By The Way, being ousted halfway through recording in March 1972 when Kravetz rejoined the band. Baumann expressed a desire to establish a solo career also, and the band played a "farewell concert" on 26 June 1972 with Thomas (Carola) Kretschmer on guitar. Musikexpress published an obituary for the band in August 1972. The obituary closed with: "We request that you refrain from messages of condolence, since you will soon be hearing from Inga, Karl-Heinz and Jean-Jacques under another name."

A double live album, Live, was released in 1973, after the band disbanded.

== Post-disbanding ==
Shortly after Frumpy disbanded, Rumpf, Kravetz and Schott recruited guitarist Frank Diez and drummer Curt Cress, both formerly with Munich-based jazz fusion combo Emergency, to form a "supergroup" called Atlantis. Atlantis, which has been described as "Frumpy repackaged with a more commercial hard-rock style," recorded their first album Atlantis in 1972, which was released early in 1973. Rumpf was voted 'Best Female Rock Singer of 1973' by Musikexpress readers. Diez and Cress were replaced by George Meier and Lindenberg for the subsequent tour, who were themselves replaced by Dieter Bornschlegel and Ringo Funk when the tour ended. They then released It's Getting Better (1973), which had a strong Afrobeat influence, and caused Die Zeit to hail Rumpf as a "superstar", after which in early 1974 Kravetz left the band to join Randy Pie. Schnelle was replaced again by Adrian Askew and Bornschlegel by Curly Curve's Alex Conti. The third album Ooh Baby (1974) was written mostly by Askew and Conti and veered towards the P-funk sound, and the band toured the U.S. as a support act for Aerosmith and Lynyrd Skynyrd. Following more changes in line-up two further albums were released, Get On Board (1975) and Live (1975), but, despite achieving commercial success in Germany, the group disbanded in January 1976. On 23 February 1983, the founder members played a one-off reunion concert in Hamburg.

== Reunion ==
In 1989, Rumpf, Bohn and Kravetz reformed Frumpy and released two albums, Now! (1990) and News (1991). By 1992 the members had moved in different directions and the group disbanded again in 1995.

== Discography ==
- All Will Be Changed (1970)
- Frumpy 2 (1971)
- By the Way (1972)
- Live (1973)
- Now! (1990)
- News (1991)
- Live NinetyFive (1995)
