= Torichan Kravets =

Russian and Soviet physicist

Torichan Pavlovich Kravets (Russian: Торичан Павлович Кравец; 22 March 1876 – 21 May 1955) was a Russian and Soviet physicist who worked on optical physics and geophysics and examined the history of physics. He was briefly exiled to Siberia on charges of being anti-Soviet from 1923 to 1926. He served as a professor at Leningrad.

Kravets was born in Volkovo, Bogoroditsky Uyezd, where his father Pavel Naumovich was a physician while his mother Felitsitana Karpovna Shagina was a midwife. He was educated at the Tula Gymnasium and then at Moscow University. He studied under P. N. Lebedev and graduated with a diploma in 1898. He then worked in Lebedev's laboratory on spectroscopy and defended his thesis in 1913. He calculated the refractive index of water for long wavelength electromagnetic waves using total internal reflection. He worked in Kharkiv from 1914 to 1922. On 16 August 1922 he was accused of anti-Soviet activities for taking part in a strike along with other professors and sent to Siberia on January 3, 1923. After five months of imprisonment, he was given an exile and forced to work at Irkutsk where he worked on geophysics in the Lake Baikal area. He also examined seiches and their influence on seismographs and was involved in setting up seismology in Irkutsk. He was released in 1926 and allowed to travel freely upon which he moved back to Leningrad where he worked on the physics of photography. He also took an interest in the history of physics from 1912 and examined the students of Lebedev.
