= Tabaluga =

Fictional dragon character

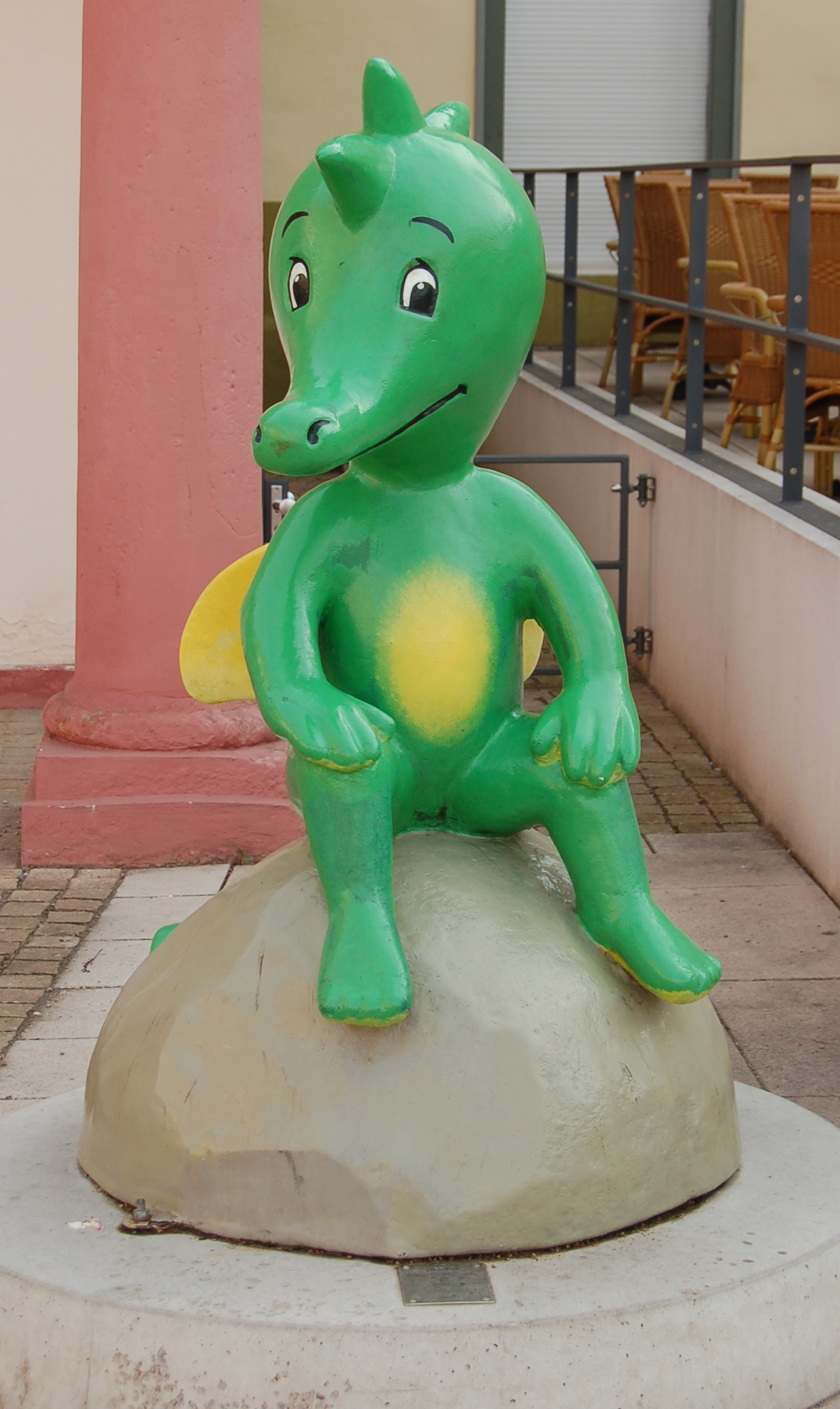
- Statue of Tabaluga in Erfurt, Germany
- First appearance: Tabaluga ... oder die Reise zur Vernunft; 1983
- Created by: Helme Heine, Peter Maffay, Rolf Zuckowski and Gregor Rottschalk
- Designed by: Helme Heine

In-universe information
- Species: Dragon
- Gender: Male
- Family: Father: Tyrion
- Nationality: German

Tabaluga is a German media franchise featuring a fictional green dragon, created by German rock musician Peter Maffay, children's songwriter Rolf Zuckowski and author Gregor Rottschalk. Artist Helme Heine drew the image of Tabaluga as it is currently known. The character Tabaluga was first introduced by Maffay in the musical fairy tale Tabaluga ... oder die Reise zur Vernunft (Tabaluga or... The Journey to Reason) in 1983. This first studio album was the step to success: within the next years some Helme Heine books, six sequel concept studio albums, two tours, a stage musical, Tabaluga und Lilli (Tabaluga and Lilli), based on the third concept album and many TV cartoons which have been broadcast in over 100 countries round the world followed and a children's game show.

== Fictional character biography ==
Tabaluga inhabits the fictional province of Greenland. He is about 7 "dragon-years" old (700 human years, as one year for a dragon is 100 for a human). His father Tyrion died when he was six. Little is known about his mother. Following his father's death, Tabaluga became the last of the dragons.

== Media ==
=== Concept albums ===
- 1983: "Tabaluga oder... die Reise zur Vernunft" (engl. "Tabaluga or... The Journey to Reason"), first concept album (LP / CD / Music Cassette)
- 1986: "Tabaluga und das leuchtende Schweigen" (engl. "Tabaluga and the Luminous Silence"), second concept album (LP / CD / Music Cassette) published in the UK 1988 as "Tabaluga and the Magic Jadestone" (LP / CD)
- 1993: "Tabaluga und Lilli" (engl. "Tabaluga and Lilli"; with Alexis playing and singing the part of "Lilli"), third concept album (LP / CD / Music Cassette)
- 2002: "Tabaluga und das verschenkte Glück" (engl. "Tabaluga and the Gift of Luck"), fourth concept album (CD / Music Cassette)
- 2011: "Tabaluga und die Zeichen der Zeit" (engl. "Tabaluga and the signs of the times"; with Mandy Capristo as "Lilli"), fifth concept album (CD / LP)
- 2015: "Tabaluga - Es lebe die Freundschaft!" (engl. "Tabaluga - Long live friendship!"), sixth concept album (CD)
- 2022: "Tabaluga - Die Welt ist wünderbar!" (engl. "Tabaluga - The world is wonderful!"), seventh concept album (CD / LP)

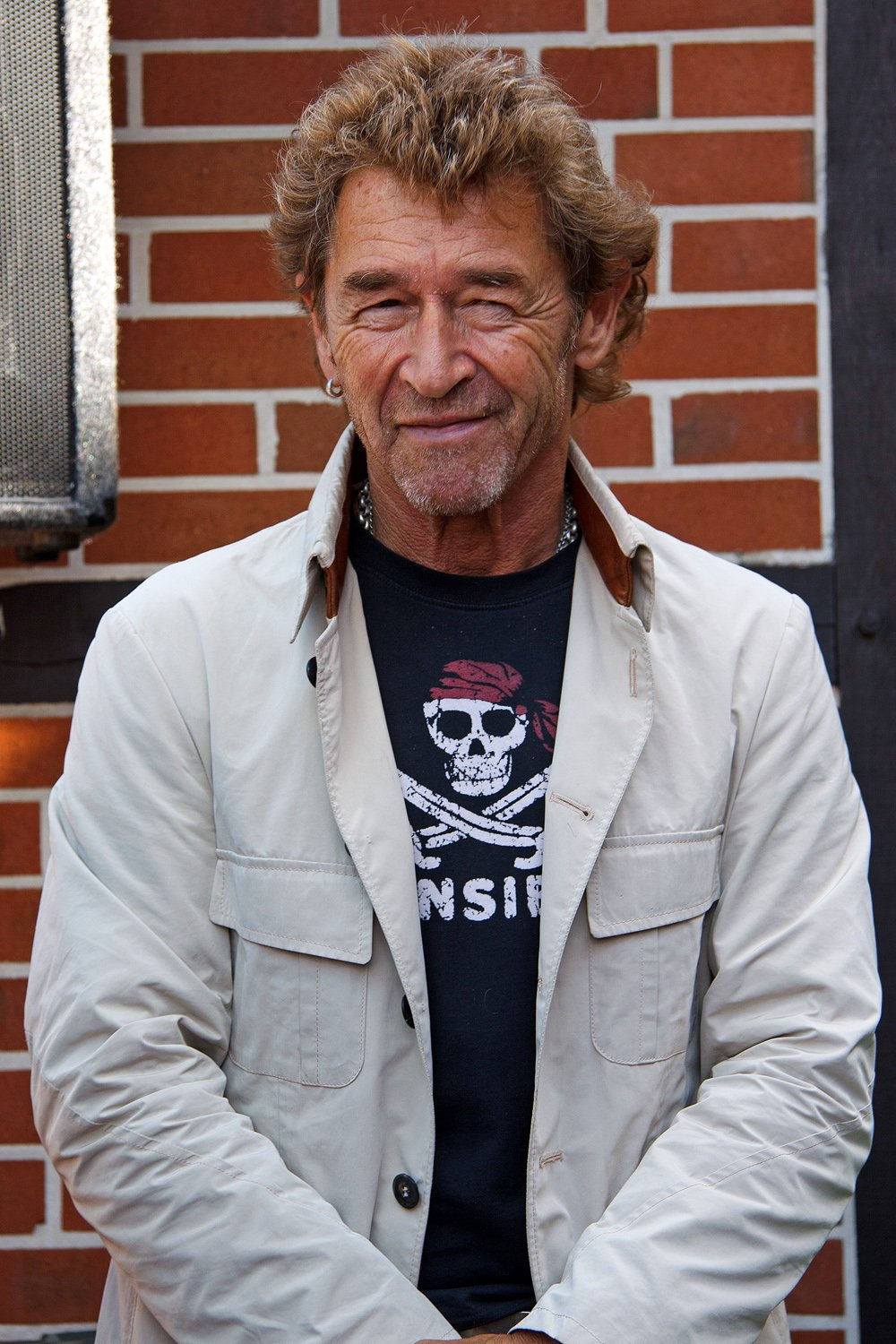
Peter Maffay, one of Tabaluga's creators

In the first album, Tabaluga oder... die Reise zur Vernunft, Tabaluga is a young dragon who gets sent by his father Tyrion in a learning quest as a punishment for not listening his admonitions. Tabaluga, who only reveres imagination, must therefore find reason. On his travel he meets the Moon, a queen of time and order; the giant Grykolos, related to the tree of life; and the fire salamander Pyromella, who Tabaluga learns coexistence with. At one point, the stork Arafron advices him to consult the 200 years old turtle Nessaja and brings him to her, and by the way Tabaluga sees a pod of dolphins who just enjoy their existence. At the end of his journey, Nessaja tells him that she never wanted to grow and that she has remained a child deep down.

In the second album, Tabaluga und das leuchtende Schweigen, Tabaluga steals a magical jade stone from Tyrion and, when the latter doesn't answer to his question about what is love, Tabaluga uses the stone to teleport. At the end of the rainbow he finds the Halfchild, the daughter of the Sun and the Moon, who cries because she cannot love herself without the Shining Silence. By advice of the rainbow, Tabaluga uses the stone to travel to a world without love, populated by robots who believe themselves to be perfect, and he only overloads them when he asks about love. Still desiring to know, he travels to the world of the shapeshifting Dream Woman, where he meets Deimon and the snake Bilingua, embodiments of hate and envy. After a last travel to the Ice World, where the cold-hearted Ice Princess keeps souls frozen forever, Tabaluga is deceived by a stranger that takes him away from his father. Tyrion fights Deimon and his fourth winds in his search for Tabaluga, and after a long battle, the old dragon is killed by Deimon, dying in remorse for not having answered to his son's question. Tabaluga is crushed by his father's death, but Death teaches him that Tyrion is now a star in the sky and that he will always love him. Next day, Tabaluga flies to the rainbow, where the Halfchild is now happy and with the Shining Silence, the mix of all colors. Looking upon all those he met in his travel, the dragon finally understands what love is.

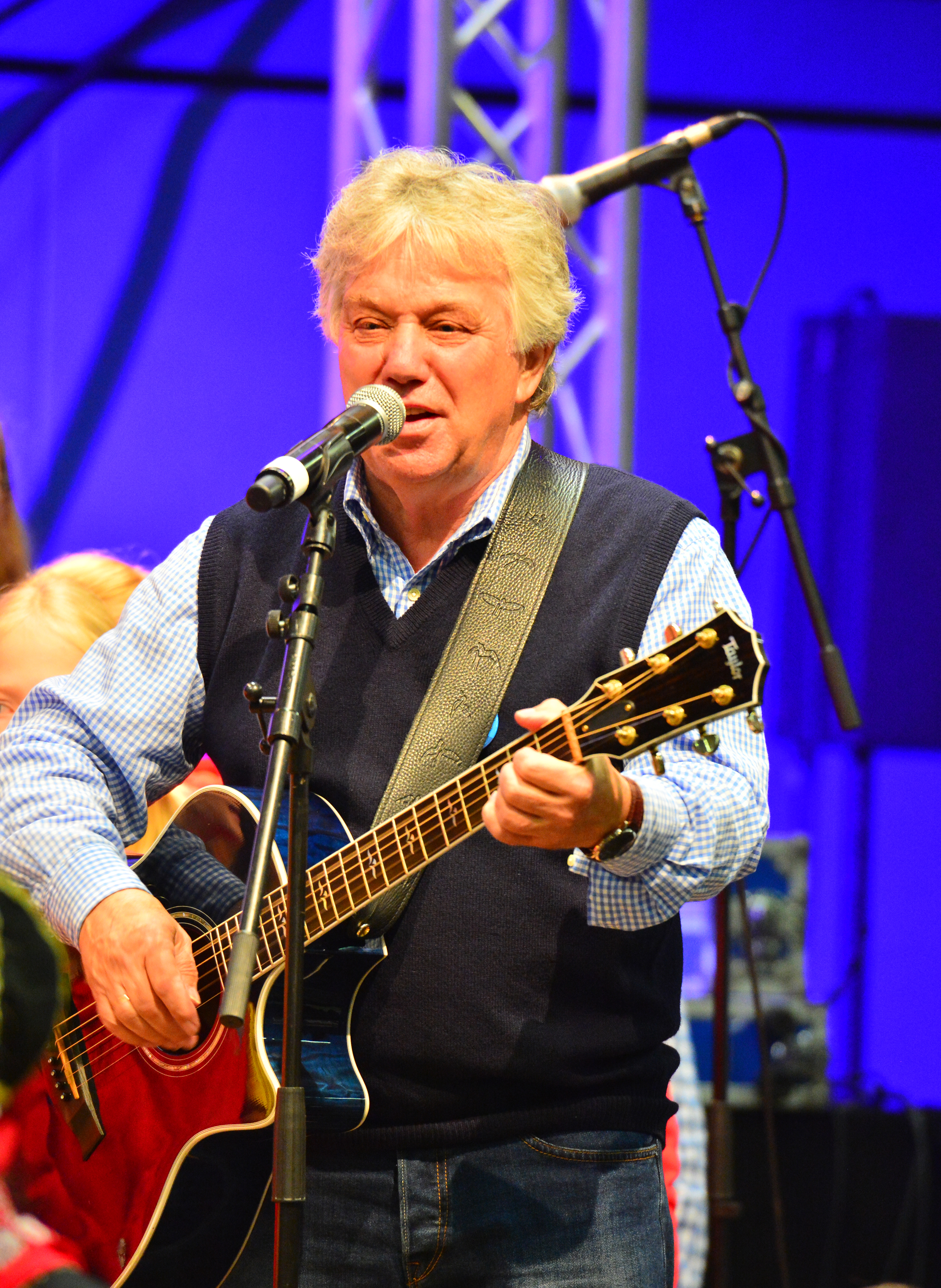
Rolf Zuckowski, another of Tabaluga's creators

In the third album, Tabaluga und Lilli, Tabaluga hears a strange noise and disobeys his father's warning not to travel to the ice kingdom. There he finds king Arktos sculpting a daughter made of ice for himself, and although an angry Arktos forces him to fly away, Tabaluga is smitten with the figure. Exhausted, he sleeps and meets his father on a dream, being told that he will have to know new things as part of life. Next morning, after being taught politeness by bees, Tabaluga discovers a volcano operated by a Crater Man, and accidentally singes himself by triggering an eruption out of curiosity. He gets thrown to the webs of black widow spider Tarantula, whom he talks with about fear and love, and eventually finds an ice castle similar to a large casino. Arktos is here and offers Tabaluga to bet Lilli against his dragon fire in a play of dice; although the dragon wins, Lilli is revealed to move only through a golden key who the evil Arktos has. Deceived, Tabaluga finds the world collapsing around him and wonders whether it was dream or reality. He feels he has lost Lilli, but the hermit crab Ostrakes talks to him about the power of love advices him to use his fire on her. By doing so, the ice of her heart melts and she gains sentience, and she and an overjoyed Tabaluga embrace.

In the fourth album, Tabaluga und das verschenkte Glück, years after defeating Arkos, Tabaluga celebrates his seventh birthday. He receives many gifts, including from Arktos himself, but he ends up loaded with heavy jeweled chains he can barely move. The ice king offers to remove a crystal chain in exchange for it, and Tabaluga, free, soars away. He trades another chain for honey with the bees, gifts a sad river with another, uses another to mend the tree of life from his first adventure, grants another to a unlucky fellow, and gifts the penultimate to a dirty pig. He also meets the Silver Fox, a friend of Arktos who tries to steal his last chain, but Tabaluga gives it voluntarily and explains he only needs his fire to live. Free from the weight, Tabaluga boastfully tries to lift an iceberg, but gets trapped underneath and Arktos takes advantage to try to conquer Greenland. Fortunately for Tabaluga, all the people he gave his chains come and form a living chain to get him free. Tabaluga ponders about friendship and, being then gifted a mirror by Nessaja, decides he doesn't want to keep holding doubts about himself.

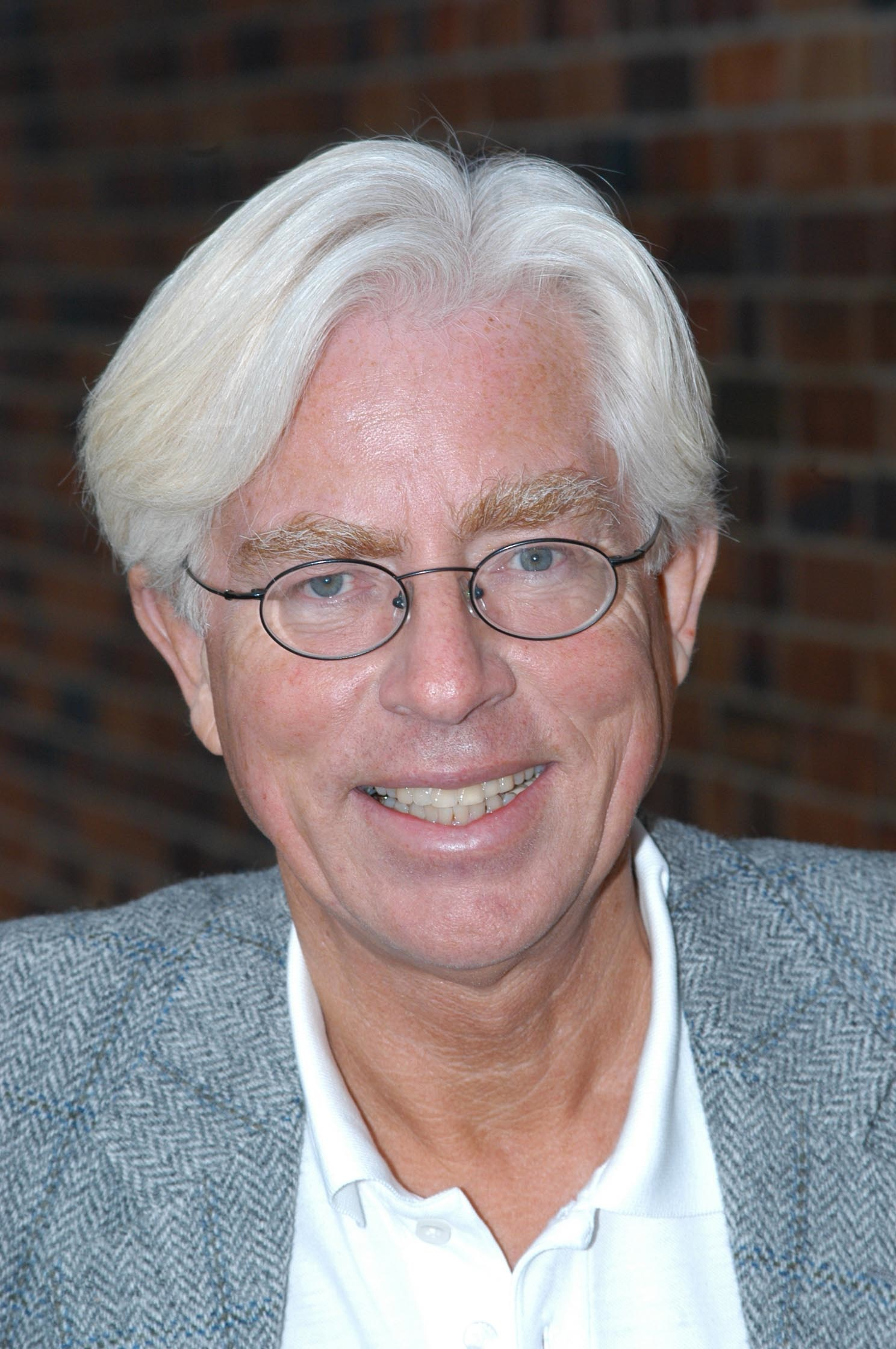
Gregor Rottschalk, the third of Tabaluga's creators

In the fifth album, Tabaluga und die Zeichen der Zeit, when Tabaluga accidentally breaks his alarm clock, he fears he has stopped time, but a stone and a mayfly explain he has not. Arktos kills the mayfly, though, so Death appears under the form of a strange fellow and explains Tabaluga that lives can have different lengths. Still wanting to learn about time, Tabaluga meets the Lion, king of beasts, but the latter believes time is money and you can never have enough of both. That night, Tyrion appears to Tabaluga in a dream and tells him time cannot be bought and that he lacked time himself with his son. Tabaluga's search for knowledge gets interrupted by his friends, who wish more time for everybody, and the four seasons, who sing four songs. With the song of summer, Arktos starts melting, but an amused Tabaluga saves him on the say that the two of them belong together. The dragon later finds a bazaar, where a dealer offers him a watch with 13 hours in exchange for his fire, but the man turns out to be the ungrateful Arktos and Tabaluga passes. He then finds Time in the form of a young woman, and she grants Tabaluga his greatest wish, to dance one more time with Lilli. When the dance is over, Tabaluga realizes that time only stops in dreams and that love is the only thing that can defeat it.

The sixth album, Tabaluga - Es lebe die Freundschaft!, sees Arktos attacking Greenland with a massive snow storm, burying Tabaluga under an avalanche. Although a bug and an army of ants manage to shovel Tabaluga free, he has lost his memory, so the bug must help him recover it. He finds the volcano from the third album and causes an enormous eruption the same way he did then, threatening both Greenland and the ice kingdom. Tabaluga and Arktos must work together to stop the volcano, and in the process they finally become friends.

=== Cartoon series ===
An animated television series was produced by Yoram Gross-Village Roadshow and Yoram Gross-EM.TV. It was broadcast from 1997 to 2004 with a total of 78 episodes split into 3 seasons. In this series, Tabaluga is the last of the dragons, and as revealed in the second season, is the crown-prince of Greenland, a magical place inhabited by talking animals of many different species. Tabaluga must defend his home from two rival kingdoms on either side of Greenland; a frigid arctic tundra, ruled by the evil snowman Arktos and a searing desert, ruled by an evil sand-spirit named Humsin.

=== Tabaluga tivi ===
Tabaluga tivi was a 90-minute television children's entertainment and game show similar to Disney Club or its German derivative, Tigerenten Club, that ran on ZDF from October 4, 1997 to 2011, serving as a mother show to the cartoon series. It featured the little green dragon Tabaluga, his friend Happy (a snow hare), his enemy Arktos (a wicked snowman) as well as the Penguin Butler "James" (who is a loyal servant of Arktos). It consisted of games, sketches, cartoons and short documentaries and was hosted by Tabaluga and some human co-hosts that changed multiple times over the years.

In the show, two teams play against each other in five competition rounds to win prizes for themselves, and to win the contents of a treasure chest, which they can donate to their school, a children's home, etc. The broadcast is transmitted by ZDF and also KiKa. In Summer 2005 the show celebrated its 400th transmission. The show is made for ZDF in co-production with Munich Production Company MingaMedia and is made in the Bavaria-Studios in Unterföhring, near Munich.

=== Musical ===
The musical "Tabaluga & Lilli" celebrated its premiere on 24 September 1999 in the TheatrO CentrO, Oberhausen, and ran there until 30 June 2001. The little dragon managed to unite the High Society of German musical actors, with stars such as Andreas Bieber, Ross Antony, Paul Kribbe, Carolin Fortenbacher. Its plot is a combination of the second and third concept albums.

In the musical, the race of the dragons is almost extinct in the battle against the kingdom of ice led by Arktos. The last great dragon king, Tyrion, has placed his hopes on his young son, Tabaluga, who must find the True Fire in order to defeat the evil. Therefore, aided by a wise wizard, Tabaluga sets out on a quest for the fire, avoiding dangers such as a black widow spider but also finding beautiful things like a group of dolphins. In this travel, Tabaluga learns that there is both good and bad in the world and that everything has its meaning a place in life.

In order to defeat Tabaluga, Arktos creates a beautiful girl of pure ice, Lilli, and sends her to charm Tabaluga so he cannot end his search for the True Fire. Tabaluga falls in love with Lilli and the plan seems to be working, and during a battle, Tyrion dies trying to protect him. Crushed, Tabaluga wants to give up, believing that his life without his father has no meaning anymore. However, he then realizes he has finally found the True Fire, which was actually the fire of love. Arktos' powers then wane and good triumphs over evil.

=== Film ===
Tabaluga (also known as Tabaluga & Lilli) is a 2018 animated film directed by Sven Unterwaldt Jr. and starring Wincent Weiss in the title role. The story follows Tabaluga, who teams up with an ice princess, Lilli, to help him find his fire, and save the world from the evil snowman, Arktos.

== History ==
Year	Information
1983	"Tabaluga oder... Die Reise zur Vernunft" (engl. "Tabaluga or... The Journey to Reason"), first concept album (LP / CD)
1986	"Tabaluga und das leuchtende Schweigen" (engl. "Tabaluga and the Luminous Silence"), second concept album (LP / CD)
1988	"Tabaluga and the Magic Jadestone", UK version of the second concept album (LP / CD)
1993	"Tabaluga und Lilli" (engl. "Tabaluga and Lilli"; with Alexis playing and singing the part of "Lilli"), third concept album (CD): 1994: Rock fairytale tour "Tabaluga & Lilli" (90 appearances with a total attendance of around 700,000), based on the first and third concept album
1994	"Tabaluga und Lilli – Live" (engl. "Tabaluga and Lilli Live"), first live album (tour of 1994; 2CD)
1994	"Tabaluga und Lilli – Live" (engl. "Tabaluga and Lilli Live"), first live video (tour of 1994; VHS)
1995	"Tabaluga" Trailer
1997	"Tabaluga" TV cartoon series – first 26 episodes (at children's game show "Tabaluga tivi"; ZDF und KiKA)
1998	Tabaluga premieres on Cartoon Network Europe
1999	"Tabaluga & Lilli" musical (essentially the same as the tour version, but with a different cast) was premiered at TheatrO CentrO in Oberhausen
1999	"Tabaluga" video game for Game Boy and Game Boy Color
1999	Stamp "Für die Jugend − Tabaluga" (engl. "For the youth − Tabaluga")
2001	"Tabaluga" TV cartoon series – second 26 episodes (again on ZDF und KiKA)
2002	"Tabaluga und das verschenkte Glück" (engl. "Tabaluga and the Gift of Luck"), fourth concept album (CD)
2003	Rock fairytale tour "Tabaluga und das verschenkte Glück", based on the fourth concept album
2003	"Tabaluga und Leo – Das Weihnachtshörspiel" (engl. "Tabaluga and Leo – The Christmas radio play"), based on the TV cartoon series (CD)
2003/04	"Tabaluga" TV cartoon series – third 26 episodes (again on ZDF und KiKA): 2004: "Tabaluga und das verschenkte Glück – Live" (engl. "Tabaluga and the Gift of Luck – Live"), second live video (first live DVD; tour of 2003)
2004	"Tabaluga viatja buscant el seny", Catalan version of the first concept album (MC and CD)
2005	"Tabaluga" was also staged for the first time in Mallorca, and drew an exceptionally large audience. The singers, Josep Carreras and Cris Juanico, along with Udo Jürgens and Peter Maffay bought the concept to the stage.
2005	"Tabaluga und Leo" (engl. "Tabaluga and Leo"); Christmas cartoon film; based on the TV cartoon series
2006	"Tabaluga und Lilli − Live" ("Tabaluga and Lilli − Live"), first live VHS video now released as live DVD (second live DVD; tour of 1994)
2007	"Frohe Weihnachten mit Tabaluga" ("Merry Christmas with Tabaluga"), Christmas album (CD)
2010	"Tabaluga und Leo – Weihnachtsspecial" (engl. "Tabaluga and Leo − Christmas special"), video of the 2005 Christmas cartoon film (DVD)
2011	"Tabaluga tivi" is canceled after 14 years
2011	"Tabaluga und die Zeichen der Zeit" (engl. "Tabaluga and the signs of the times"; with Mandy Capristo as "Lilli"), fifth concept album (CD)
2012	Rock fairytale tour "Tabaluga und die Zeichen der Zeit", based on the fifth concept album (planned for autumn)
2018	Tabaluga: The Movie
