= Asher Kravitz =

Israeli academic and author

- אשר קרביץ
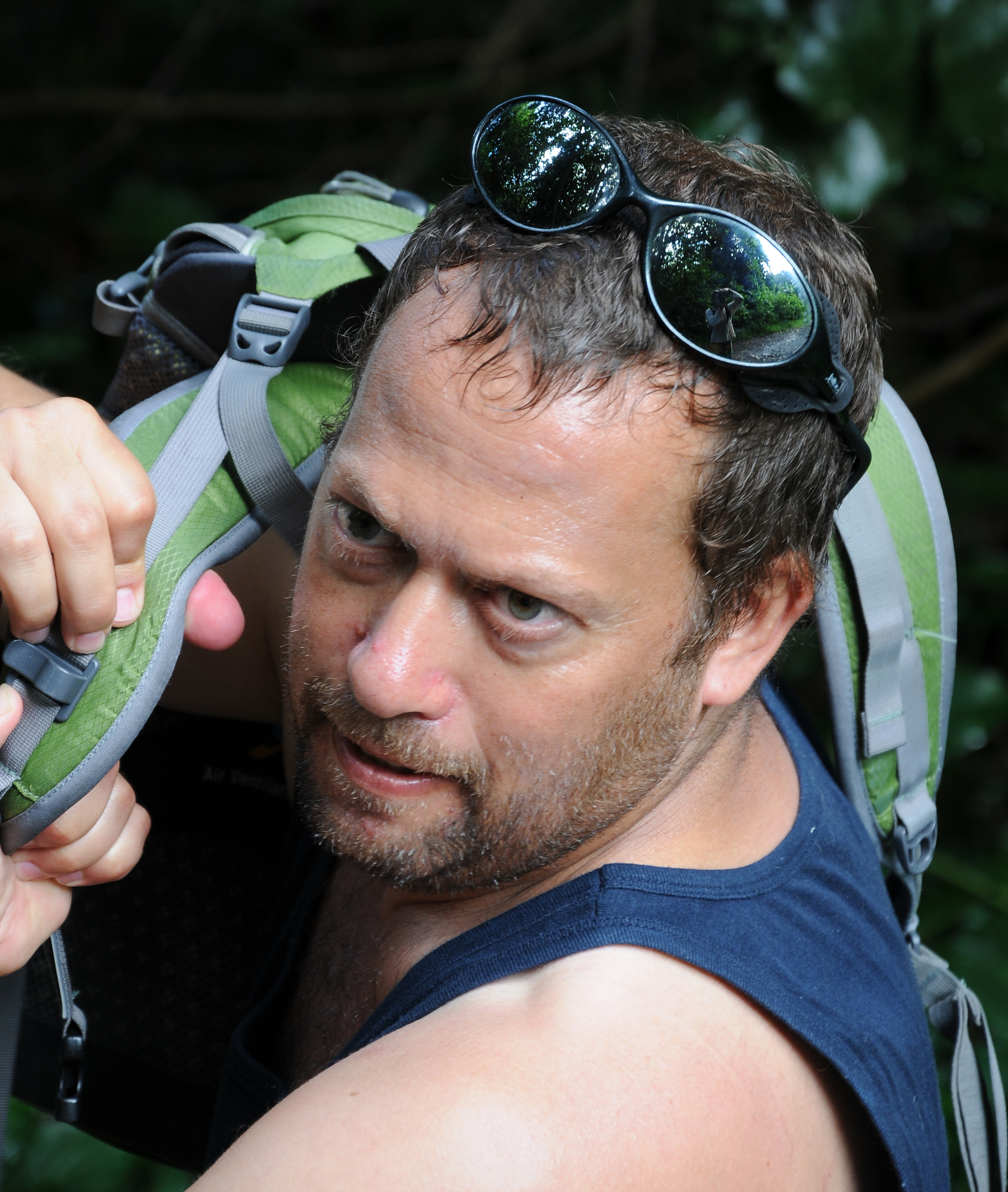
- Born: 1969 (age 56–57); Jerusalem, Israel
- Education: Hebrew University of Jerusalem, Technion – Israel Institute of Technology
- Occupations: Author, Lecturer
- Writing career
- Language: Hebrew
- Genres: Fiction, Non-fiction
- Subjects: Animal rights, Wildlife
- Notable works: The Jewish Dog, Boomerang

Asher Kravitz (Hebrew: אשר קרביץ; born 1969), is an Israeli author and lecturer on physics and mathematics at the Academic College of Engineering in Jerusalem and the Open University. He is also an animal rights activist and wildlife photographer.

== Biography ==
Kravitz was born in Jerusalem and raised in a traditional Jewish home. He studied electronics at Kiryat Noar, a vocational yeshiva high school, and at the Djanogly High School in Jerusalem. His military service in the Israeli Army began in the Commando Brigade of the Armored Corps. Toward the end of his service, he served as an instructor of Krav Maga.

Kravitz completed his bachelor's degree in Physics at the Hebrew University and his master's degree at the Technion. While studying at the Technion, he joined the Israeli Police Force and served as an investigator in the National Unit for the Investigation of Serious Crimes. After leaving the police force, he taught for two years at the High School of Arts and Sciences.

Since the year 2000, Kravitz has been teaching courses in mathematics and physics at the Academic College of Engineering in Jerusalem and at the Open University of Israel. He also lectured on literature at the Hebrew University School for Overseas Students.

== Photography and documentation of wildlife ==
Since 1997, Kravitz has worked on documenting wildlife through photography, both in Israel and in Africa. During the 2000s, a number of his articles on animal rights and well-being were published. Kravitz documented his many excursions to Africa with extensive photography of its wildlife and also participated in an Israeli mission to set up a haven for orphaned gorillas in Cameroon.

== Books ==
His first two books, Magic Square (G'vanim, 2002) and Boomerang (Keter, 2003), are whodunits with plots built around complex criminal cases. His third book, I'm Mustafa Rabinowitz (Kibbutz M'uhad, 2005), is a story about a soldier fighting in an anti-terrorist unit in the Israeli army and the moral dilemmas that he faces. His fourth book, The Jewish Dog (Yediot Books, 2007), is the post-mortem autobiography of Koresh, a dog born into the household of a German Jewish family during the pre-Holocaust period in Germany, and his lifelong travails. This last novel was awarded a "Diamond Citation" by the Book Publishers Association of Israel.
