= Lee Kravitz =

American magazine editor

Lee Kravitz is the author of Unfinished Business and was editor-in-chief of Parade magazine from 2000 until he was fired in 2008.

== Scholastic, Inc. ==
From 1987 to 1995, Kravitz was an editorial director of Scholastic Inc., an educational publishing company. He oversaw several classroom magazines, including Choices, Science World, Search, Update, and Junior Scholastic. He also served as director of new media and special projects for the company's 37 magazines. Among the products and programs he developed were the Scholastic/NBC News Videos with Bryant Gumbel and Katie Couric, "Write Lyrics!" with Elektra Records, "SuperScience with Molly and Bert", an animated distance-learning series on Georgia Public Television, Scholastic NewsFax and the National Student Town Meeting Series on C-SPAN.

== React ==
Kravitz came to Parade in 1995 to launch React. He also managed react.com, a website aimed at teenagers. React reached a weekly circulation of 3 million through 245 newspapers before its close in June 2000.

== Parade magazine ==
On March 1, 2000, Kravitz became editor-in-chief and senior vice president of Parade. At Parade, Kravitz worked on franchises such as "What People Earn", "What America Eats" and the Parade High School All-American teams. He also developed the popular PARADE Snapshot and Parade Picks columns. Kravitz commissioned articles by writers and journalists such as Mitch Albom, Michael Crichton, Bruce Feiler, David Halberstam, Norman Mailer, Jack Newfield, Gail Sheehy, Jim Webb and Elie Wiesel. Among the national and world leaders he edited were Aung Sun Suu Kyi, Colin Powell, Bill Clinton and George W. Bush. Cover stories during his tenure included Parade's annual ranking of the ten worst dictators and David Wallechinsky's "Visit to the Bridge to Nowhere". The response to this article led Congress to rescind a $235 million earmark to build two bridges in a remote part of Alaska. Kravitz's term as editor-in-chief and senior vice president ended when he was fired in 2008.

During this time, Kravitz also initiated cause-related campaigns with such organizations as the American Heart Association, the National Trust for Historic Preservation, HGTV, the Food Network, Research!America, The White House Project, Share Our Strength, ABC Entertainment, and The Nature Conservancy.

== Education and awards ==
An honors graduate of Yale University and the Columbia University Graduate School of Journalism, Kravitz grew up in Cleveland, Ohio, where he attended University School. He began his career as a freelance writer and photojournalist, traveling to more than 40 countries. He and the magazines under his direction have received more than 200 journalism awards. In 1992, he won the Silver Gavel Award from the American Bar Association for "'Scholastic SEARCH: The Bill of Rights,' an innovative publication using rich stories to illustrate how the Bill of Rights affects students' daily lives." He was also awarded the President's Award from the Association of Educational Publishers for his contributions to that industry.

== Personal life ==
Kravitz lives in Manhattan and Clinton Corners, New York, with his wife, the literary agent Elizabeth Kaplan, and their three children: Benjamin, Caroline, and Noah. He is the author of Unfinished Business: One Man's Extraordinary Year of Trying to Do the Right Things, published by Bloomsbury USA.
