= Andrij Kravets =

Ukrainian Go player (born 1990)

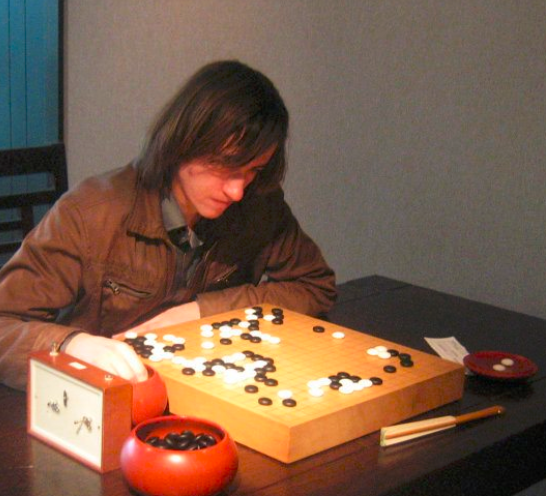
- Andrij Kravets, 2012

Personal information
- Born: December 12, 1990 (age 35) Rivne, Ukraine

Sport
- Turned pro: 2017
- Rank: 4-dan pro

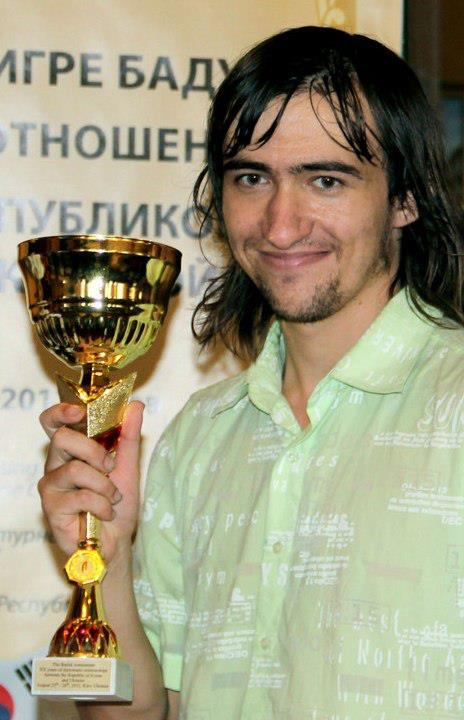
Andrij Kravets, 2012

Andrij (also Andrii) Kravets (born December 12, 1990, Rivne) is a 4-dan professional Go player from Ukraine; 3-time European Go Champion 2023, 2024, 2026 member of numerous international amateur competitions (3rd European Pro Qualification, 2016) and previous Ukrainian Champion (2012, 2015). In 2021, Kravets and his wife relocated to Germany.

== Go career ==
1999 – started to play.

2002 – 1st place, Youth Go Championship in category under 12, Prague.

2006 – Promoted to 4-dan.

2008 – Promoted to 5-dan.

2008 – Represented Ukraine in the 1st World Mind Sports competition, Beijing.

2010 – 2nd place in Ukrainian Championship (High League), Kyiv.

2011, 2012, 2013 – 3rd place in the European Team Championship.

2012 – Promoted to 6-dan.

2012 – 3rd place in 5th Shusaku Cup, Targu Mures.

2012 – 3rd place in European Iwamoto Memorial Tournament, Amsterdam.

2012 and 2015 – 1st place in Ukrainian Championship (High League), Kyiv.

2017 – 1st place in the 4th Pro Qualification Tournament, thus awarded 1-dan professional status by the European Go Federation.

2019 – European Professional Championship - shared 2nd place, Pandanet Go European Team Championship 3rd place.

2021 – Pandanet Go European Team Championship 3rd place.

2022 – Pandanet Go European Team Championship 1st place.

2023 – 1st place in the European Championship finals 2023, thus awarded the title of the European Champion 2023 by the European Go Federation. Pandanet Go European Team Championship 1st place.

2024 – Crowned European Champion for the second successive year. Pandanet Go European Team Championship 2nd place.
