= Richard Krawiec =

American writer (born 1952)

Richard Krawiec is an American writer. He was born in 1952 in Brockton, MA, and currently lives in North Carolina with his two sons. His most famous work is Time Sharing (1986). This novel was featured in Publishers Weekly 'Recommended List', the Village Voice 'Real Life Rock Top Ten column, and received attention from Jonathan Yardley in The Washington Post, Richard Eder in the Los Angeles Times, and in the 'In Short' column of the 'N.Y. Sunday Times', although it got a mixed review from Michiko Kakutani in The New York Times.

== Career ==
Krawiec published a second novel, Faith In What? and the short story collection And Fools of God. These books were reviewed by "Publishers Weekly", "Kirkus", and "Library Journal". He is the editor of two anthologies of North Carolina authors, "Cardinal" and "Voices From Home", which included authors like Allan Gurganus, Reynolds Price, Lee Smith, Fred Chappell, and Elizabeth Spencer. He has written two sports biographies for young people, one about basketball star Yao Ming and the other about Olympic Gold Medal-winning skater Sarah Hughes. His biography of Yao Ming was cited as one of the "Forty Best Books of the Year" in 2004 by the Pennsylvania Librarians Association.

His first chapbook of poetry, "Breakdown" was published in March, 2008 by Main Street Rag Press. His second book of poetry, "She Hands Me the Razor" was published in 2012 by Press 53. He has had 4 plays published by Big Dog Publishing.

His feature articles for "Pittsburgh" magazine won national and regional awards. His column "Under the Radar" runs monthly in the Raleigh News and Observer. It features discussions of literary and small presses. Krawiec also wrote the Beginning and Intermediate Fiction Writing curriculum for the UNC-Chapel Hill Independent Studies Program, where he teaches online writing classes. He is the 2009 recipient of the Excellence in Teaching Award from UNC-Chapel Hill for these courses.

Krawiec has won a Creative Writing Fellowship from the National Endowment for the Arts, two fellowships from the NC Arts Council, and one from the Pennsylvania Council on the Arts.

Krawiec is also the founder of Jacar Press, a Community Active Press that publishes poetry and contributes proceeds to fund workshops in underserved areas.

In an interview with Robert D. Wilson of the E-journal Simply Haiku, Krawiec said: "Many of my friends lived in the projects. So I grew up hanging around with people who were primarily excluded... I found myself telling the stories of those who were ‘voiceless’."

== Works ==
=== Novels ===
- Time Sharing, (1986)
- Faith In What?, (1996)

=== Short story collections ===
- Cardinal, (editor)
- Voices From Home, (editor)
- And Fools of God

=== Poetry collections ===
- She Hands Me the Razor, (2012)
- Breakdown, (2008)

=== Plays ===
- Aieee!, (2005)
- Battlefield, (2005)
- Here, There, Or In The Air, (2005)
- If You Really Loved Me, (2007)
