= Time Sharing (novel) =

1986 novel by Richard Krawiec

- First edition cover
- Author: Richard Krawiec
- Language: English
- Publisher: Viking Press
- Publication date: 1986
- ISBN: 0-670-80944-6 (first edition)
- Dewey Decimal: 813.54
- LC Class: PS3561.R33 T5

Time Sharing is a 1986 novel by American writer Richard Krawiec, published by Viking Press. Set in Boston, the novel follows Artie, a purse-snatcher, and Jolene, a single mother. Artie initially pretends to befriend Jolene in the hope of exploiting her, while Jolene tries to see good in him and hopes he can become a father figure to her son, Dandy. As the relationship develops, Artie begins to care for Jolene genuinely. The novel ends after Artie accidentally shoots a cashier during a holdup; while awaiting arrest, he feels no remorse for the killing but grieves the likely loss of his relationship with Jolene.

== Background and publication ==
Time Sharing was published by Viking Press on February 1, 1986.

== Reception ==
Publishers Weekly praised the novel, particularly Krawiec's portrayal of Artie and Jolene. Kirkus Reviews gave the book a mixed review, describing it as "caught somewhere between belly-laughing satire and a more humanitarian concern", while also calling Krawiec a talented writer. Reviews in The New York Times and the Los Angeles Times characterised the novel as tragicomic.
