= Jean-Jacques Kravetz =

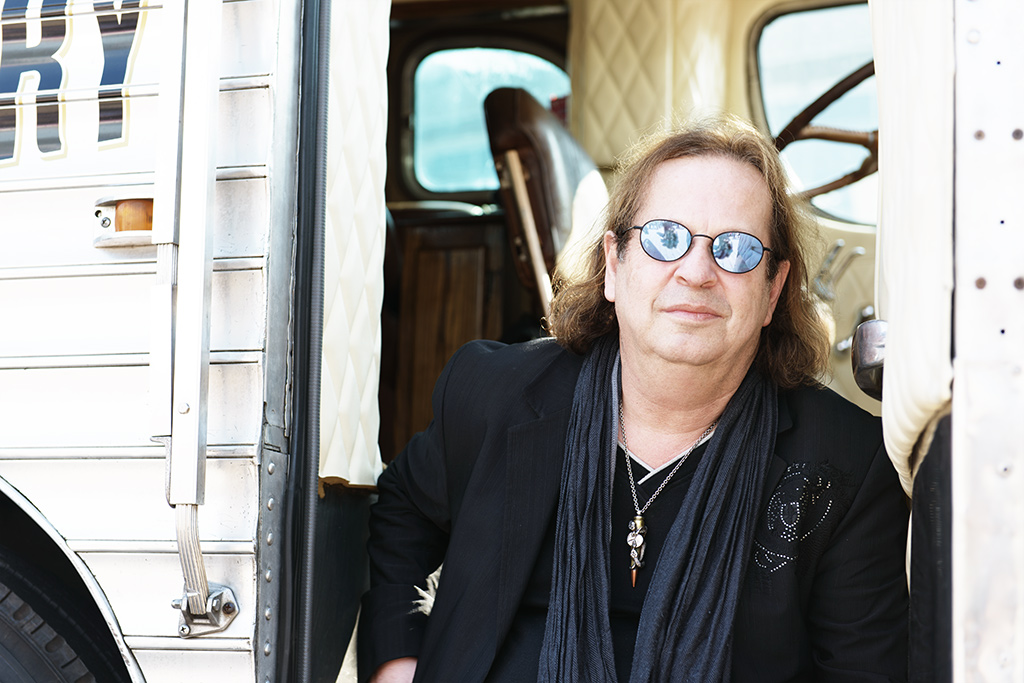
- Jean-Jacques Kravetz, 2014

Background information
- Born: May 23, 1947 (age 77); Paris, France
- Genres: Krautrock, progressive rock, rock and roll
- Occupation(s): Musician, composer, keyboardist
- Instrument: Keyboard
- Years active: 1965 – present
- Website: kravetz.de

Jean-Jacques Kravetz (born May 23, 1947) is a French keyboardist, saxophonist and composer. He has played in the bands backing German rock singers Udo Lindenberg and Peter Maffay since the 1970s as well as playing with many other German bands as a guest musician. He was the keyboardist for the German progressive rock band Frumpy from 1969 to 1972.

== Biography ==
Jean-Jacques Kravetz studied alto saxophone and piano at the Conservatoire de Paris from 1960 until 1965. He founded his first band in Paris in 1965. In 1966 he joined the band Les Piteuls with who he recorded for the first time. In 1967 he moved to Hamburg, Germany and worked as a saxophone teacher at the Hamburger Konservatorium until 1975. He played as a member of the bands Die City Preachers, Frumpy and Atlantis.

He has been a constant member of Udo Lindenberg's Panik Orchester since 1975 and of the Peter-Maffay-Band since 1977. His son Pascal Kravetz is a multi-instrumentalist and has played with Maffay since the late 1980s.
