= Peter Maffay =

German singer and musician (born 1949)

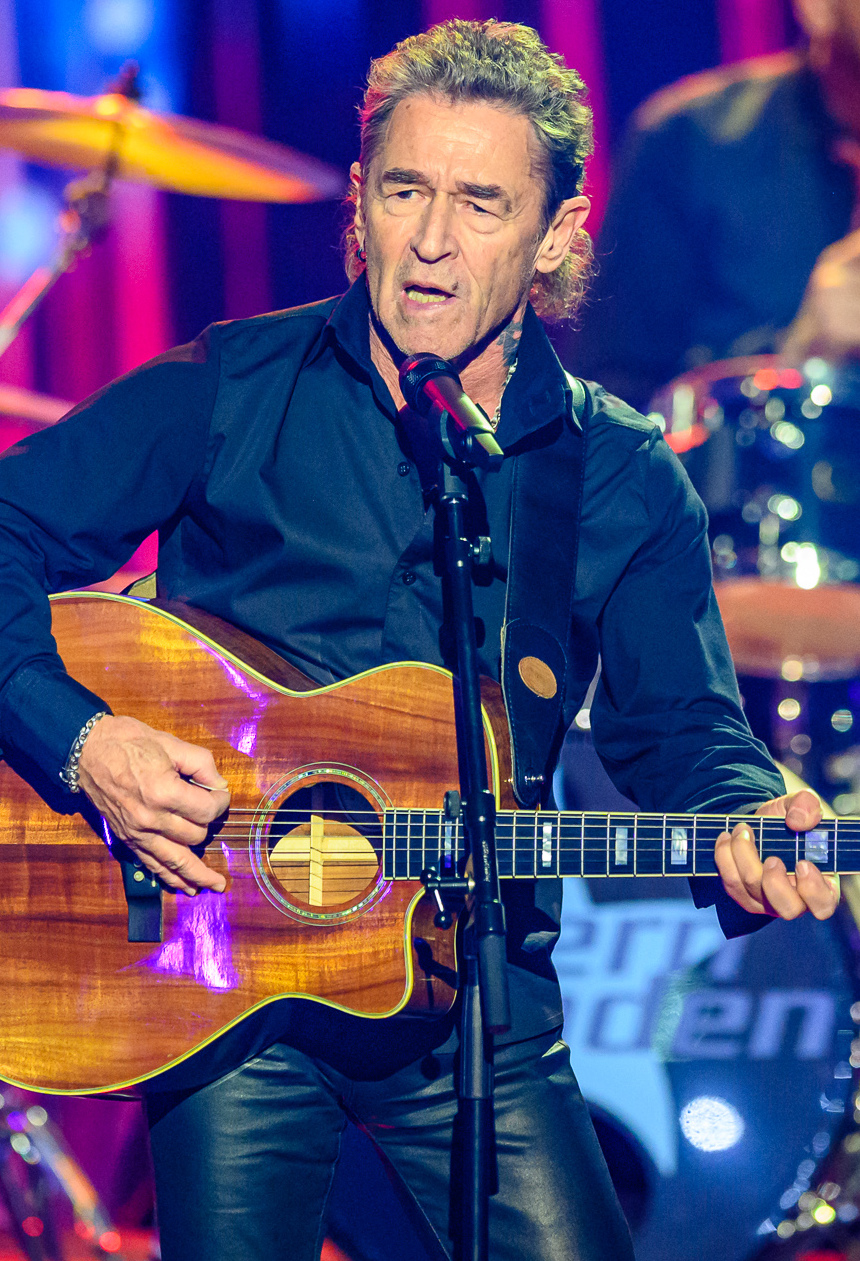
- Maffay performing in 2019

Background information
- Born: Peter Alexander Makkay; 30 August 1949 (age 77); Brașov, Romania
- Origin: West Germany
- Genres: Rock, schlager
- Occupations: Musician, singer, composer
- Instruments: Vocals, guitar
- Years active: 1969–present
- Labels: BMG Ariola, Telefunken
- Website: maffay.de (in German)

Peter Alexander Makkay (born 30 August 1949), known as Peter Maffay (German pronunciation: [ˌpetɐ ˈmafaɪ̯]), is a Romanian-born German musician, singer, and composer. Being a veteran musician, he is often credited for motivating audiences with his emotional lyrics and powerful melodies, establishing himself as a cornerstone of the German music scene.

== Early life and background ==
Born in Braşov (German: Kronstadt), Romania, the son of a German (Transylvanian Saxon), he was 14 when his family relocated to his parents' West Germany in 1963. In the same year, he started his first band, The Dukes. After completing his education and working for Chemigraphics, an art manufacturer, Maffay worked in clubs, where he distributed his music.

Maffay's career started with the publication of his first single, "Du" ("You"). It was his biggest German hit in 1970 and brought him instant fame. With the 1979 album Steppenwolf, he became a major music star in Germany. The album sold 1.6 million copies, making it one of the best selling albums at that time. In 1980, the album Revanche ("Revenge") broke his previous record, selling more than 2.1 million copies.

== Career ==
Working with Michael Kunze, Maffay co-wrote the song "Ich bin wie du" for Elke Best. Backed with "Die Spiele der großen Leute" it was produced by Fritz Muschler and released on EMI Electrola 006-30 462 in 1973.

Together with German singer-songwriter Johnny Tame he formed a successful country rock duo in 1976 called Tame & Maffay. They released two albums and continued a close cooperation until 1985.

Maffay also created a string of fairy tales about a little green dragon named Tabaluga. The tales, which spanned across five albums, were also turned into a musical. Maffay went on tour individually with Tabaluga & Lilli in Germany; he later released a live album, DVD, and live TV broadcast. The tour included Maffay, Alexis, Nino de Angelo, Rufus Beck, and Carl Carlton, among others.

In 1998, Maffay created an album in collaboration with global artists, including Aboriginal singers and musicians from Israel, called "Begegnungen". Julia Neigel, another German artist, is one of the musicians he usually works with in lyrics and singing in duets. She wrote two of his top singles, "Freiheit die ich meine" and "Siehst du die Sonne", a cover of Michel Polnareff's "La Poupée qui fait non".

Maffay also starred in two films directed by Peter Patzak—Lethal Obsession in 1987 and Captive in Yemen in 1999—for which Tony Carey provided the soundtrack. In addition, Maffay played a supporting role in 1998's The Polar Bear.

On 12 March 2011, Maffay received the Steiger Award.

Maffay holds the German record for the most number one ranked album sales charts, including 16 albums. In addition, each of his studio albums since 1979 reached the top ten. He also holds the German record for most albums to have sold over one million copies, with 14. His 2005 album, Laut und Leise ("Loud and Quiet"), became the 14th.

Altogether, Maffay has sold over 40 million records, which makes him one of the top selling artists in Germany. Since 1980, each of his 13 tours (roughly every two years) has ranked among the third most-visited musical events in Germany, with nine of them ranked first in that category. The first leg of his 2015 tour (19 Arena shows) sold out nearly a year in advance.

In 2022, Maffay served as a judge on The Voice of Germany. In September 2023, American singer Anastacia released her album Our Songs; Maffay duetted with Anastacia on the song "Just You", an English-translated version of the former's "So bist du". The official music video was released on 21 September 2023.

=== Peter Maffay Band ===
Carl Carlton has been a constant member in Maffay's band. Likewise, for many years, Bertram Engel (drums), Ken Taylor (bass), and Jean-Jacques Kravetz (piano) have worked together with Maffay. Some time later, Kravetz brought his son Pascal Kravetz (guitar) with him into the fold. Frank Diez, member of the Peter Maffay Band since 1974, left the group in 2004. So did Andreas Becker and some other members Maffay's band, in order to pursue other projects. He worked together with John Mayall and Chris Thompson. American keyboard player Tony Carey, who produced many of his records, also took part in his live band for many years. The newest addition to the band is guitarist Peter Keller, from Hamburg.

== Personal life ==
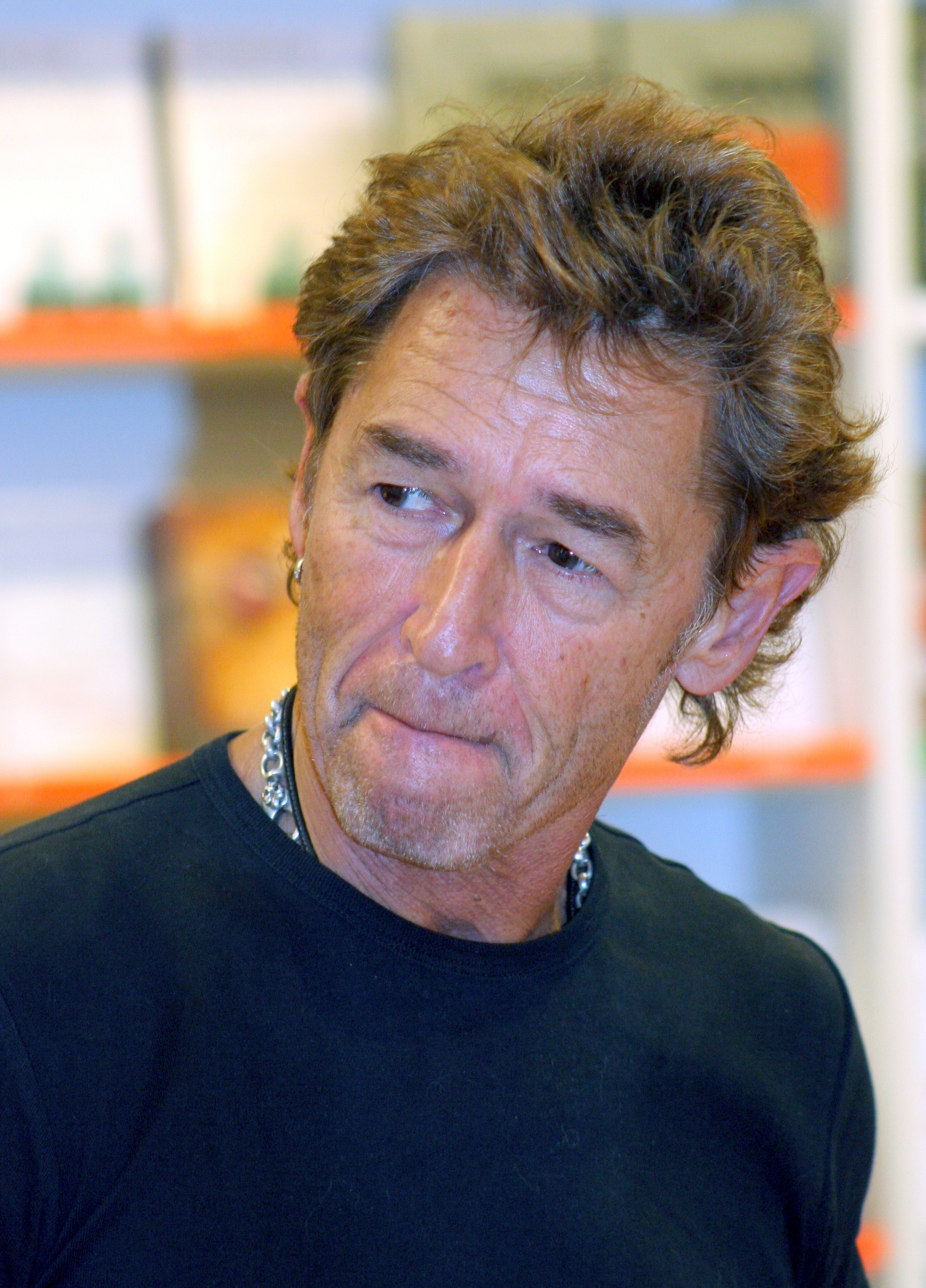
Maffay in 2009

Maffay is active in politics and sometimes inserts his own political stances into his music. He is a peace activist, and in 2005 he performed a concert for German International Security Assistance Force (ISAF) troops in Afghanistan. Maffay also donates to projects for traumatised and abused children. On the Spanish island of Mallorca, he established a ranch where traumatised children from all over the world can have a free two-week holiday to help them cope with their problems. For his social commitment, he received the Bundesverdienstkreuz in 1996, and, in 2001, he received the Goldene Henne, an award commemorating Helga Hahnemann. He has been awarded the Toleranzpreis der Evangelischen Akademie Tutzing in 2012.

Maffay has been married five times, has a son and lives with his family on a farm on Mallorca. One of his hobbies is motorcycle riding. In 1972, he was severely injured in an accident after crashing his Harley-Davidson. Later in life, he crossed the Sahara Desert several times on an off-road motorcycle.

== Discography ==
- 1970: Für das Mädchen, das ich liebe (CD / LP) (For the Girl that I Love)
- 1971: Du bist wie ein Lied (CD / LP) (You are like a song)
- 1972: Omen (CD / 2LP)
- 1974: Samstagabend in unserer Straße (CD / LP) (Saturday Evening in our Street)
- 1975: Meine Freiheit (CD / LP) (My Freedom)
- 1976: Und es war Sommer (CD / LP) (And it was Summer)
- 1977: Tame & Maffay (CD / LP)
- 1977: Dein Gesicht (CD / LP) (Your face)
- 1978: Live (CD / LP)
- 1979: Steppenwolf (CD / LP)
- 1979: Tame & Maffay 2 (CD / LP)
- 1980: Revanche (CD /LP) (Revenge)
- 1982: Ich will Leben (CD / LP) (I want to live)
- 1982: Live '82 (CD / LP / VHS)
- 1983: Tabaluga oder die Reise zur Vernunft (CD / LP) (Tabaluga or the Journey to Reason)
- 1984: Carambolage (CD / LP)
- 1984: Deutschland '84 (DVD / VHS)
- 1985: Sonne in der Nacht (CD / LP / DVD / VHS) (Sun in the Night)
- 1986: Tabaluga und das leuchtende Schweigen (CD / LP) (Tabaluga and the Luminous Silence)
- 1987: Live '87 (DVD / VHS)
- 1988: Lange Schatten (2CD / 2LP) (Long Shadows)
- 1988: Lange Schatten Tour '88 (CD / LP / VHS) (Long Shadows Tour 1988)
- 1989: Kein Weg zu Weit (CD / LP / DVD / VHS) (No Way to Far)
- 1990: Leipzig (CD / LP / VHS)
- 1991: 38317 (CD / LP)
- 1991: 38317 – Das Clubconcert (DVD / VHS)
- 1992: Freunde und Propheten (CD) (Friends and Prophets)
- 1993: Der Weg 1979–93 (CD / VHS) (The Way 1979 to 1993)
- 1993: Tabaluga und Lilli (CD) (Tabaluga and Lilli)
- 1994: Tabaluga und Lilli Live (2CD / VHS) (Tabaluga and Lilli Live)
- 1996: Sechsundneunzig (CD) (Ninety-Six)(DE: No. 1, 4× Platinum)
- 1996: Sechsundneunzig – Das Clubconcert (DVD / VHS) (Ninety Six – Club Concert)
- 1997: 96 Live (2CD / DVD / VHS)
- 1998: Begegnungen (CD / DVD / VHS)(DE: No. 5, 2× Platinum) (Encounters)
- 1999: Begegnungen Live (2CD) (Encounters Live
- 2000: X (CD)(DE: No. 2, 2× Platinum)
- 2001: Heute vor dreissig Jahren (CD) (Thirty Years ago today)(DE: No. 1, 3× Platinum)
- 2001: Heute vor dreissig Jahren – Live (DVD) (Thirty Years ago today – Live)
- 2002: Tabaluga und das verschenkte Glück (CD) (Tabaluga and the Gift of Happiness)(DE: No. 3, 2× Platinum)
- 2004: Tabaluga und das verschenkte Glück – Live (DVD) (Tabaluga and the Gift of Happiness Live)
- 2005: Laut und Leise (2CD / 2DualDisc) (Loud and Quiet) (DE: No. 1, 3× Platinum)
- 2006: Begegnungen, eine Allianz fuer Kinder (CD / DVD) (Encounters, an Alliance for Children)(DE: No. 9, Platinum)
- 2007: Frohe Weihnachten mit Tabaluga (CD) (Merry Christmas with Tabaluga)
- 2008: Ewig (CD / DVD) (Eternal)(DE: No. 1, Platinum)
- 2010: Tattoos (CD) (DE: No. 1, 4× Platinum)
- 2011: Tabaluga und die Zeichen der Zeit (CD) (Tabaluga and the signs of the times)(DE: No. 1, 2× Platinum)
- 2014: Wenn das so ist (CD) (If this is the Case)(DE: No. 1, 2× Platinum)
- 2015: Tabaluga – Es lebe die Freundschaft! (CD) (Tabaluga – Long live Friendship!) (DE: No. 1)
- 2017: Erinnerungen – Die stärksten Balladen (CD) (Memories – The Strongest Ballads) (DE: No. 11)
- 2017: MTV Unplugged (CD) (DE: No. 1, Gold)
- 2018: plugged – Die stärksten Rocksongs (CD) (DE: No. 11)
- 2019: Jetzt! (CD) (DE: No. 1) (Now!)
- 2021: So weit (CD) (DE: No. 1) (So far)
- 2022: Tabaluga – Die Welt ist wunderbar! (CD) (Tabaluga – The world is wonderful!)

Awards and achievements
Preceded by Ernst Nolte; Otfried Preußler	Konrad Adenauer Prize; 2001	Most recent
