= List of the Animals band members =

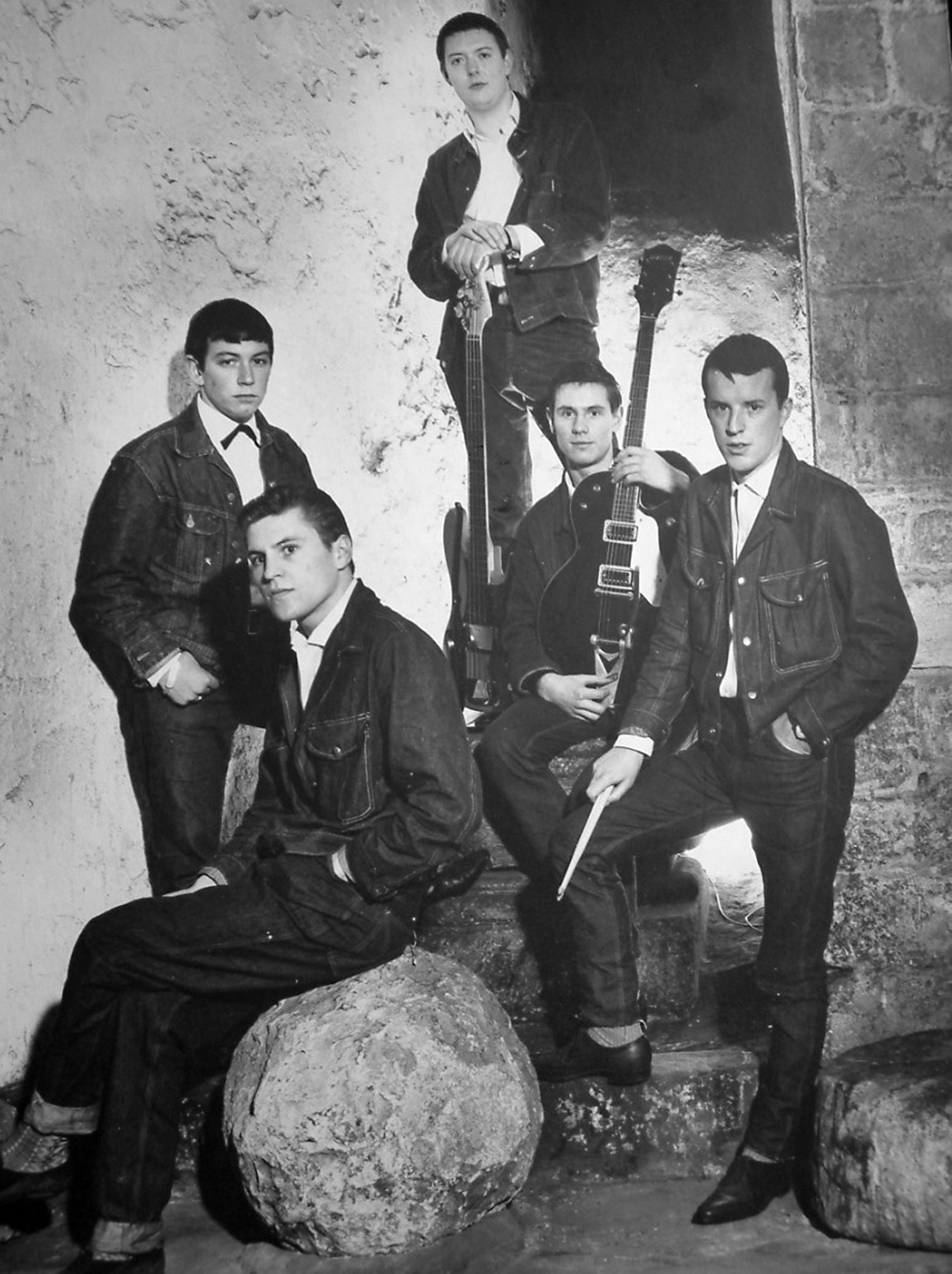
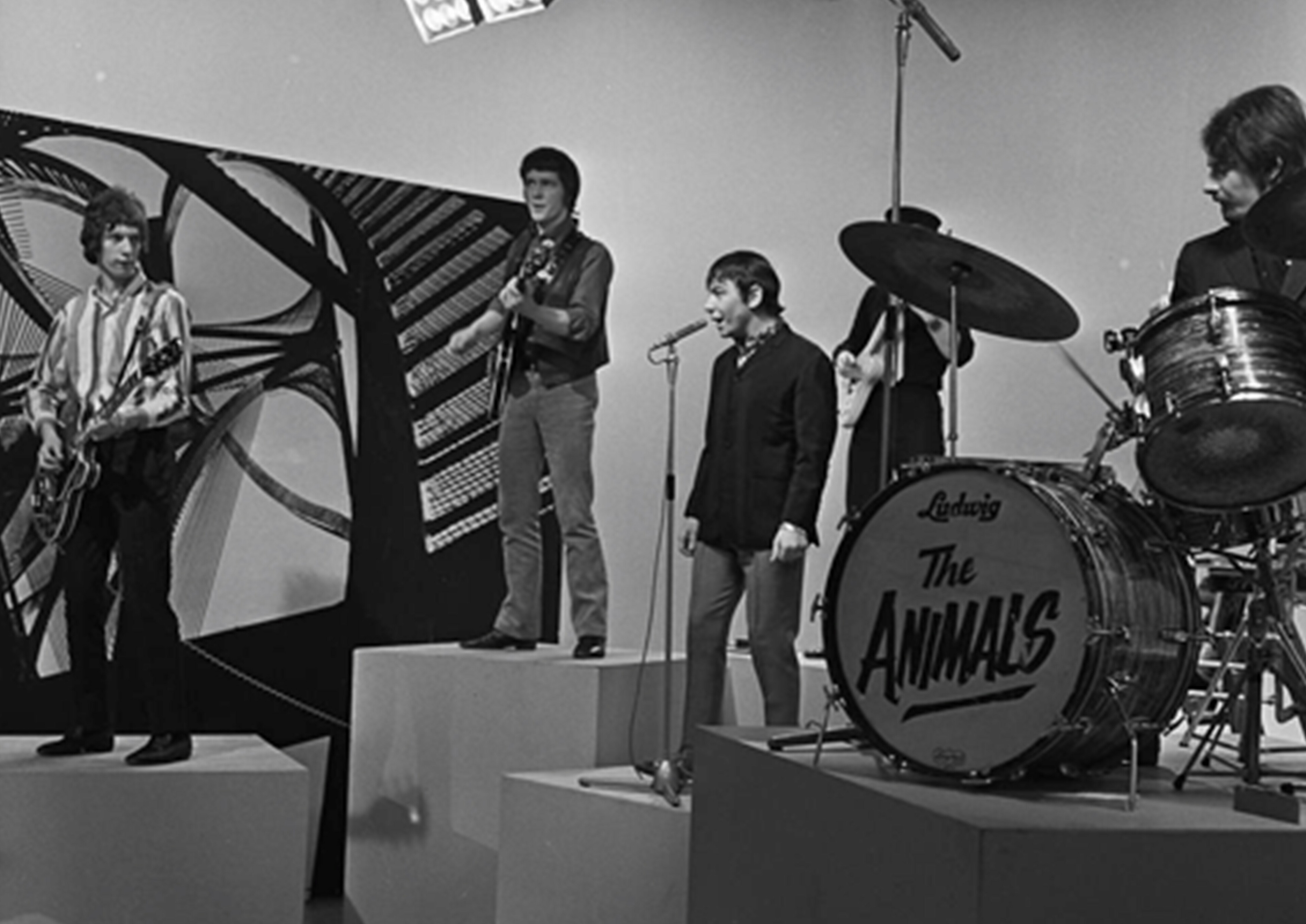
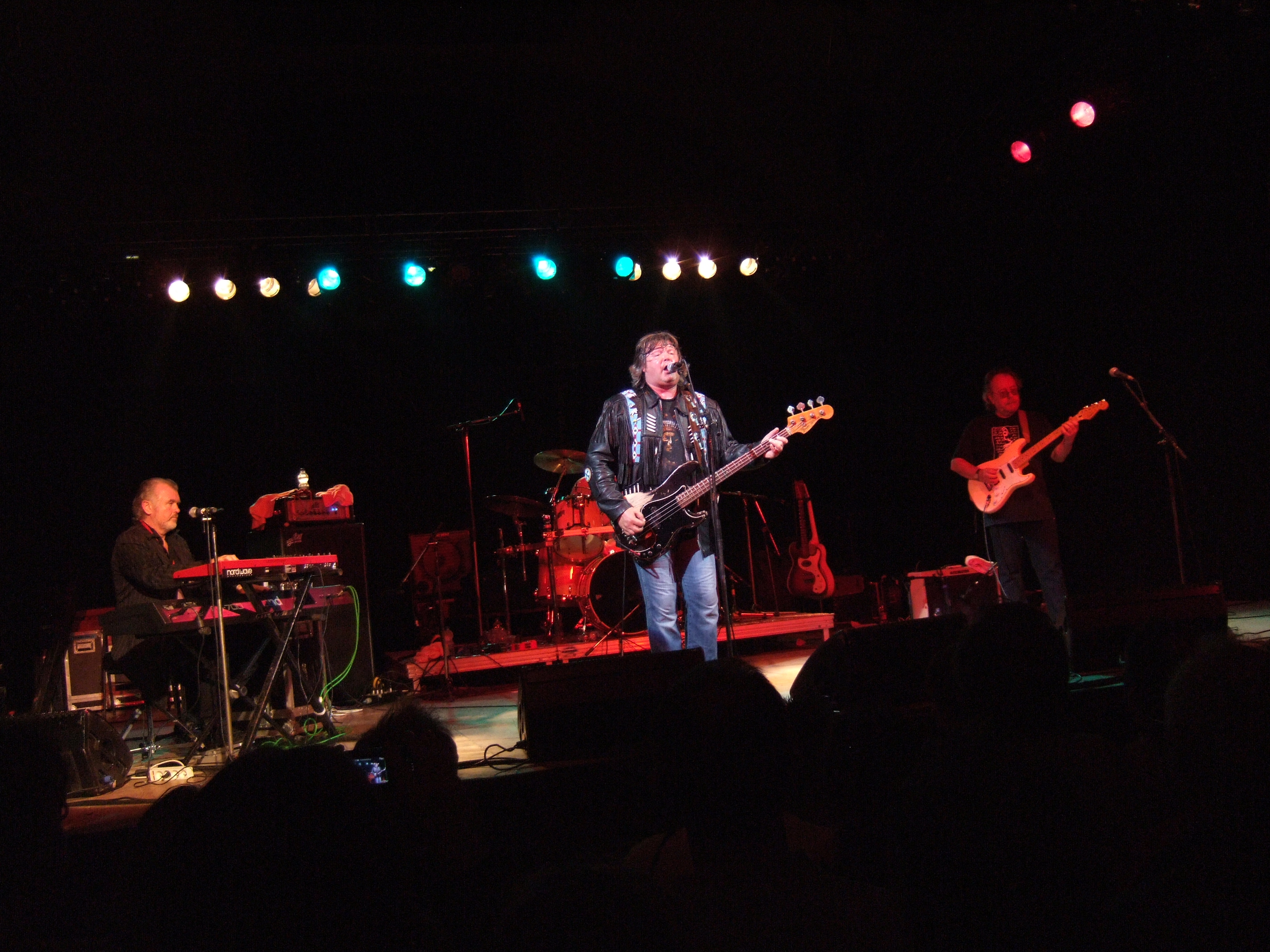
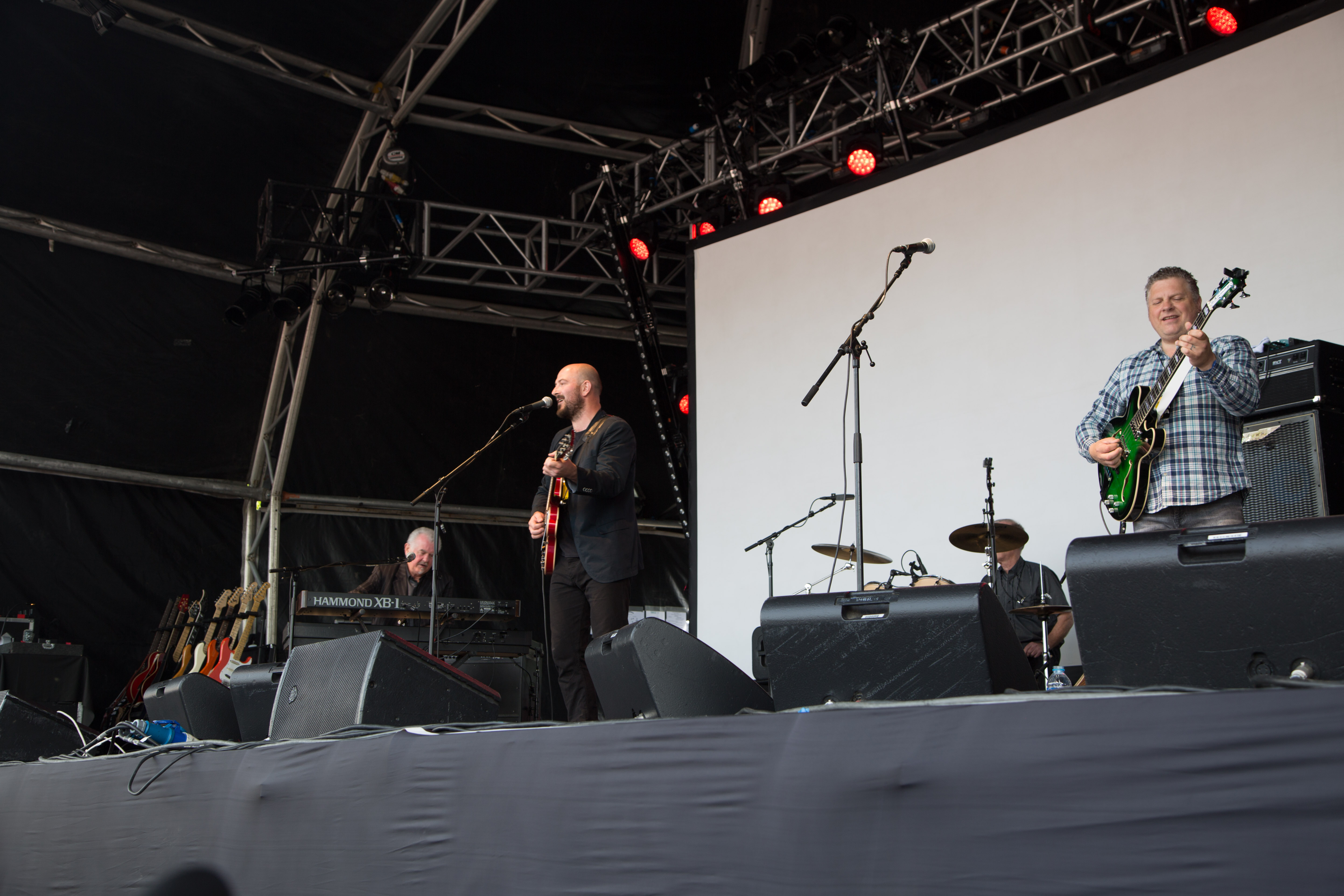
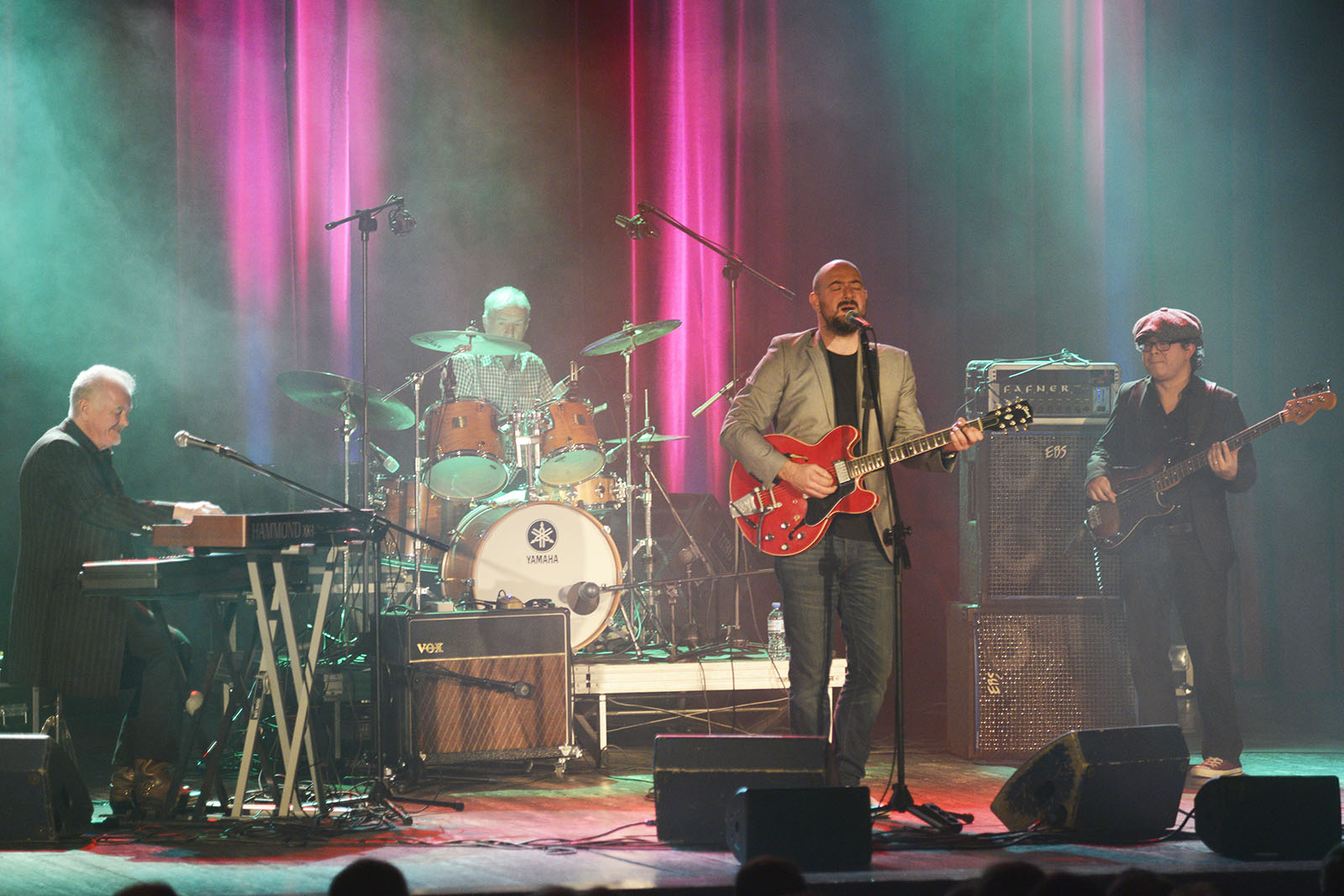
Five line-ups of The Animals performing in 1964, 1967, 2008, 2015 and 2016

The Animals are an English rock band founded as Alan Price Rhythm and Blues Combo in 1962, by Eric Burdon (vocals), Alan Price (keyboards), Hilton Valentine (guitar), John Steel (drums) and Bryan "Chas" Chandler (bass). Two versions of the band currently exist one is led by Steel under the name Animals and Friends and another is led by Burdon under the name Eric Burdon and the Animals, which is also the name the band went by between 1966–1969 after all other original band members had departed.

Steel's version includes Steel (since 1994), guitarist and vocalist Danny Handley (since 2009), keyboardist Barney Williams (since 2022) and bassist and vocalist Norman Helm (since 2023). Burdon's version has been active since 2016 and features Davey Allen (keyboards, vocals), Dustin Koester (drums, vocals), Justin Andres (bass, vocals), Johnzo West (guitar, vocals), Ruben Salinas (saxophone, flute) and Evan Mackey (trombone).

== History ==
=== 1962–1969 ===
Formed in Newcastle upon Tyne during 1962 and 1963 when Burdon joined the Alan Price Rhythm and Blues Combo, the original lineup was Burdon (vocals), Price (organ and keyboards), Hilton Valentine (guitar), John Steel (drums) and Bryan "Chas" Chandler (bass), they changed their name to the Animals.

By May 1965, the group was starting to feel internal pressures. Price left because of personal and musical differences, as well as his fear of flying while on tour. He went on to a successful career as a solo artist and with the Alan Price Set. Mick Gallagher filled in for Price on keyboards for a short time until Dave Rowberry replaced Gallagher.

The Animals assembled a big band to play at the fifth annual British Jazz and Blues Festival in Richmond. The Animals Big Band made their one public appearance on 5 August 1965. In addition to Burdon, Rowberry, Valentine, Chandler and Steel, the band featured a brass/horn section of Ian Carr, Kenny Wheeler and Greg Brown on trumpet and Stan Robinson, Al Gay, Dick Morrissey and Paul Carroll on saxophone.

In February 1966, Steel left and was replaced by Barry Jenkins. Burdon began work on a solo album called Eric Is Here, By this time, the Animals' business affairs "were in a total shambles" according to Chandler (who went on to manage Jimi Hendrix and produce Slade) and the group disbanded.

A group with Burdon, Jenkins and new sidemen John Weider (guitar/violin/bass), Vic Briggs (guitar/piano) and Danny McCulloch (bass) was formed under the name Eric Burdon and Animals (or sometimes Eric Burdon and the New Animals) in December 1966. Zoot Money was added to the lineup in April 1968, initially as organist/pianist only, but upon McCulloch's departure, he also took on bass and occasional lead vocals. In July 1968, Andy Summers (later the guitarist for the Police) replaced Briggs. Both Money and Summers were formerly of British psychedelic outfit Dantalian's Chariot. By December 1968, this incarnation of the Animals had dissolved.

=== 1968– Reunions ===
The original Animals lineup of Burdon, Price, Valentine, Chandler and Steel reunited for a benefit concert in Newcastle in December 1968 and reformed in late 1975 to record again. They embarked on a brief tour in 1976 and shot videos for their new songs such as "Lonely Avenue" and "Please Send Me Someone to Love". They released an album in 1977 that was aptly titled Before We Were So Rudely Interrupted.

On 12 December 1982, Burdon performed with Price and a complete lineup, foreshadowing future events.

All five original band members reunited in 1983 for the album Ark and a world concert tour, supplemented by Zoot Money on keyboards, Nippy Noya on percussion, Steve Gregory on saxophone and Steve Grant on guitar.

In the 1990s, Danny McCulloch, from the later-1960s Animals, released several albums as the Animals. The albums contained covers of some original Animals songs, as well as new ones written by McCulloch.

In 1992, Barry Jenkins joined a reconstituted version of the Animals, including "New Animals" members Vic Briggs and Danny McCulloch along with new percussionist Jack McCulloch and Phil Ryan instead of Eric Burdon on lead vocals. The band played the first rock concert held in Red Square, Moscow, as part of a benefit concert for the victims of the Chernobyl nuclear disaster.

Also in 1992, Hilton Valentine formed the Animals II from a local North East band he was playing with called The Alligators, and was joined by Steel in 1994 and Rowberry in 1999. Other members of this version of the band include Robert Kane (now vocalist with Dr. Feelgood), Steve Hutchinson, Steve Dawson (now guitarist with Geordie) and Martin Bland.

From 1999 until Valentine's departure in 2001, the band toured under the name the Animals. This version featured Tony Liddle on lead vocals backed by Valentine, Steel, Rowberry and Jim Rodford. Chris Allen occasionally substituted for Rodford (while he was playing with The Zombies). Steve Farrell contributed backing vocals and hand percussion.

After Valentine left this line up in Summer 2001, Steel and Rowberry continued with Steve Dawson, who returned to replace Valentine until the Winter of 2002. The band then morphed into Animals and Friends, with Peter Barton on vocals, Rodford, and John E. Williamson on guitar. When Rowberry died in 2003, he was replaced by Mick Gallagher (who had briefly replaced Price in 1965). Danny Handley joined the band in 2009, initially as lead guitarist, but replaced Barton on lead vocals when Barton retired in 2012. Scott Whitley had a brief tenure in the band before Roberto "Bobby" Ruiz took over on bass. This successful lineup continues to tour the world with guests such as Steve Cropper and Spencer Davis. In 2022, Barney Williams replaced Gallagher due to the latter's ill health.

In 2016, Burdon formed the current lineup of Eric Burdon and the Animals, including Johnzo West (guitar/vocals), Davey Allen (keys/vocals), Dustin Koester (drums/vocals), Justin Andres (bass guitar/vocals), Ruben Salinas (sax/flute) and Evan Mackey (trombone).

== Members ==
=== Original band ===
Image	Name	Years active	Instruments	Release contributions
	Eric Burdon	1963–1966; 1975–1976; 1983	vocals	All Animals releases
	Hilton Valentine	1963–1966; 1975–1976; 1983 (died 2021)	guitar; backing vocals	All Animals releases
	Chas Chandler	1963–1966; 1975–1976; 1983 (died 1996)	bass; vocals	All Animals releases
	John Steel	1963–1966; 1975–1976; 1983	drums	All Animals releases
	Alan Price	1963–1965; 1975–1976; 1983	keyboards; backing vocals	All Animals releases except Animalisms (1966; UK), Animalization (1966; US) and Animalism (1966; US)
	Mick Gallagher	1965	keyboards; backing vocals	none
	Dave Rowberry	1965–1966 (died 2003)	keyboards; backing vocals	Animal Tracks (1965; US); Animalisms (1966; UK); Animalization (1966; US); Animalism (1966; US); The Best of The Animals (1966); The Most of the Animals (1966)
	Barry Jenkins	1966 (died 2024)	drums	Animalisms (1966; UK); Animalization (1966; US); Animalism (1966; US); The Best of The Animals (1966); The Most of the Animals (1966)
	Zoot Money	1983 (died 2024)	keyboards	Ark (1983); Greatest Hits Live (Rip It to Shreds) (1984)
	Steve Grant	1983	guitar; synthesiser; backing vocals	Ark (1983); Greatest Hits Live (Rip It to Shreds) (1984)
	Steve Gregory	1983	saxophones	Ark (1983); Greatest Hits Live (Rip It to Shreds) (1984)
	Nippy Noya	1983	percussion	Ark (1983); Greatest Hits Live (Rip It to Shreds) (1984)

=== Current members ===
Animals and Friends

Image	Name	Years active	Instruments	Release contributions
	John Steel	1994–present	drums	none
	Danny Handley	2009–present	guitar; vocals	none
	Barney Williams	2022–present	keyboards; backing vocals	none
	Norman Helm	2023–present	bass; vocals	none

Eric Burdon and The Animals

Image	Name	Years active	Instruments	Release contributions
	Eric Burdon	1966–1968; 2016–present	vocals	all releases
	Davey Allen	2016–present	keyboards; vocals	none
	Dustin Koester	2016–present	drums; vocals	none
	Justin Andres	2016–present	bass; vocals	none
	Johnzo West	2016–present	guitar; vocals	none
	Ruben Salinas	2016–present	saxophone; flute	none
	Evan Mackey	2016–present	trombone	none

=== Former members ===
Animals and Friends/Animals II/Valentine's Animals

Image	Name	Years active	Instruments	Release contributions
	Hilton Valentine	1992–2001 (died 2021)	guitar	none
	Robert Kane	1992–1999	vocals	none
	Joss Elliott	1992–1994	bass	none
	George Fearon	1992–1994	guitar	none
	Dave Dodsworth	1992–1994	drums	none
	Steve Hutchinson	1994–1999	keyboards	none
	Fred Hill	1994–1995	bass	none
	Dave Whiffin	1994–1995	guitar	none
	Steve Dawson	1995–1999; 2001–2002	guitar	none
	Martin Bland	1995–1999	bass	none
	Steve 'ih' Farrell	1999	backing vocals; percussion	none
	Tony Liddle	1999–2001; 2001–2002	vocals	none
	Eamon Cronin	2001	vocals	none
	Jim Rodford	1999–2003 (died 2018)	bass	none
	Dave Rowberry	1999–2003 (until his death)	keyboards	none
	Pete Barton	2001–2011	vocals; bass; guitar	none
	John E. Williamson	2001–2009	guitar; vocals	none
	Mick Gallagher	2003–2022	keyboards; backing vocals	none
	Scott Whitley	2011–2012	bass; vocals	none
	Roberto Ruiz	2012–2023	bass; vocals	none

Eric Burdon and The Animals

Image	Name	Years active	Instruments	Release contributions
	Barry Jenkins	1966–1968 (died 2024)	drums; backing vocals	all Eric Burdon and The Animals releases
	John Weider	1966–1968 (died 2025)	guitar; bass; violin; backing vocals	all Eric Burdon and The Animals releases
	Vic Briggs	1966–1968 (died 2021)	guitar; piano; bass	Winds of Change (1967); The Twain Shall Meet (1968); Every One of Us (1968; US); The Greatest Hits of Eric Burdon and The Animals (1969)
	Danny McCulloch	1966–1968 (died 2015)	bass; vocals; guitar	Winds of Change (1967); The Twain Shall Meet (1968); Every One of Us (1968; US); The Greatest Hits of Eric Burdon and The Animals (1969)
	Zoot Money	1968 (died 2024)	keyboards; bass; vocals	Every One of Us (1968; US); Love Is (1968); The Greatest Hits of Eric Burdon and The Animals (1969)
	Andy Summers	1968	guitar; bass; backing vocals	Love Is (1968); The Greatest Hits of Eric Burdon and The Animals (1969)

== Line-ups ==
Period	Members	Releases
1963 – May 1965 The Animals	Eric Burdon – vocals; Chas Chandler – bass, backing vocals; Alan Price – keyboards, backing vocals; John Steel – drums; Hilton Valentine – guitar, backing vocals	The Animals (1964; US) / The Animals (1964; UK); The Animals on Tour (1965; US); Animal Tracks (1965; UK); Animal Tracks (1965; US); The Best of The Animals (1966)
May 1965	Eric Burdon – vocals; Chas Chandler – bass, backing vocals; John Steel – drums; Hilton Valentine – guitar, backing vocals; Mick Gallagher – keyboards	
May 1965 – February 1966	Eric Burdon – vocals; Chas Chandler – bass, vocals; John Steel – drums; Hilton Valentine – guitar, backing vocals; Dave Rowberry – keyboards	Animal Tracks (1965; US) two tracks; The Best of The Animals (1966) two tracks; Animalization (1966; US); Animalisms (1966; UK)
February–September 1966	Eric Burdon – vocals; Chas Chandler – bass, vocals; Hilton Valentine – guitar, backing vocals; Dave Rowberry – keyboards; Barry Jenkins – drums	Animalization (1966; US) three tracks; Animalism (1966; US) unspecified tracks; Animalisms (1966; UK) three tracks
December 1966 – April 1968 Eric Burdon and the Animals	Eric Burdon – vocals; Barry Jenkins – drums; Vic Briggs – guitar, piano; Danny McCulloch – bass, vocals; John Weider – guitar, violin, bass	Animalism (1966; US) unspecified tracks; Winds of Change (1967); The Twain Shall Meet (1968); The Greatest Hits of Eric Burdon and The Animals (1969)
April–July 1968	Eric Burdon – vocals; Barry Jenkins – drums; Vic Briggs – guitar, piano, bass; Danny McCulloch – bass, vocals, guitar; John Weider – guitar, violin, celeste; Zoot Money – keyboards, vocals	Every One of Us (1968; US); The Greatest Hits of Eric Burdon and The Animals (1969)
July–December 1968	Eric Burdon – vocals; Barry Jenkins – drums, backing vocals; John Weider – guitar, bass (live), violin, backing vocals; Zoot Money – keyboards, bass (studio), vocals; Andy Summers – bass (live), guitar, backing vocals	Love Is (1968); The Greatest Hits of Eric Burdon and The Animals (1969)
December 1968 – 1975	Disbanded	
1975 – 1976 The Animals	Eric Burdon – vocals; Chas Chandler – bass; Alan Price – keyboards; John Steel – drums; Hilton Valentine – guitar	Before We Were So Rudely Interrupted (1977)
1976–1983	Disbanded	
September–December 1983	Eric Burdon – vocals; Chas Chandler – bass, backing vocals; Alan Price – keyboards, backing vocals; John Steel – drums; Hilton Valentine– guitar; Steve Grant – guitar, synthesiser, backing vocals; Steve Gregory – saxophones; Zoot Money – keyboards; Nippy Noya – percussion	Ark (1983)
1983–1992	Disbanded	
1992 Valentine's Animals	Hilton Valentine – guitar; Robert Kane – vocals; Joss Elliott – bass; George Fearon – guitar; Dave Dodsworth – drums	none
1994–1995 Animals II	Hilton Valentine – guitar; Robert Kane – vocals; Steve Hutchinson – keyboards; Dave Whiffin – guitar; Fred Hill – bass; John Steel – drums	none
1995–1999	Hilton Valentine – guitar; Robert Kane – vocals; Steve Hutchinson– keyboards; John Steel – drums; Steve Dawson – guitar; Martin Bland – bass	none
1999	Hilton Valentine – guitar; Robert Kane – vocals; Steve Hutchinson– keyboards; John Steel – drums; Steve Dawson – guitar; Martin Bland – bass; Steve 'ih' Farrell – backing vocals live	none
1999–2001 The Animals	Hilton Valentine – guitar; John Steel – drums; Tony Liddle – vocals; Jim Rodford – bass; Dave Rowberry – keyboards	none
2001	Hilton Valentine – guitar; John Steel – drums; Jim Rodford – bass; Dave Rowberry – keyboards; Eamon Cronin – vocals	none
2001–2002	Steve Dawson – guitar; John Steel – drums; Jim Rodford – bass; Dave Rowberry – keyboards; Tony Liddle – vocals	none
2001–2003 Animals and Friends	John Steel – drums; Jim Rodford – bass; Dave Rowberry – keyboards; Pete Barton – vocals, guitar; John E. Williams – guitar, vocals	none
2003–2009 Animals and Friends	John Steel – drums; Pete Barton – bass, vocals; John E. Williams – guitar, vocals; Mick Gallagher – keyboards	none
2009–2011 Animals and Friends	John Steel – drums; Pete Barton – bass, vocals; Mick Gallagher – keyboards; Danny Handley – guitar, vocals	none
2011–2012 Animals and Friends	John Steel – drums; Mick Gallagher – keyboards; Danny Handley – guitar, vocals; Scott Whitley – bass, vocals	none
2012–2022 Animals and Friends	John Steel – drums; Mick Gallagher – keyboards; Danny Handley – guitar, vocals; Roberto Ruiz – bass, vocals	none
2022–2023 Animals and Friends	John Steel – drums; Danny Handley – guitar, vocals; Roberto Ruiz – bass, vocals; Barney Williams – keyboards	none
2023–present Animals and Friends	John Steel – drums; Danny Handley – guitar, vocals; Barney Williams – keyboards; Norman Helm – bass, vocals	none

Period	Members	Releases
2016–present Eric Burdon and the Animals	Eric Burdon – vocals; Davey Allen – keyboards, vocals; Dustin Koester – drums, vocals; Justin Andres – bass, vocals; Johnzo West – guitar, vocals; Ruben Salinas – saxophone, flute; Evan Mackey – trombone	
