= Absolute Animals 1964–1968 =

Compilation album by The Animals, Eric Burdon & The Animals
- Released: 14 October 2003
- Recorded: 1964–1968
- Genre: Blues rock
- Length: 78 min.
- Label: Raven

Professional ratings
Review scores
Source	Rating
AllMusic	5/5 stars

Absolute Animals 1964–1968 is a compilation album of The Animals, released in 2003 and which features many of their hits. It was also the first compilation to feature songs from their Columbia, Decca, and MGM albums.

"Ring of Fire", "Coloured Rain", and "Good Times" are the only songs on this compilation which did not chart on the US Billboard Hot 100.

== Track list ==
1. "The House of the Rising Sun" – 4:29
2. "Boom Boom" (John Lee Hooker) – 3:17
3. "I'm Crying" (Eric Burdon, Alan Price) – 2:46
4. "Baby Let Me Take You Home" – 2:20
5. "Don't Let Me Be Misunderstood" (Bennie Benjamin, Gloria Caldwell, Sol Marcus) – 2:27
6. "Bring It On Home to Me" (Sam Cooke) – 2:42
7. "We Gotta Get out of This Place" (B.E. Mann, Cynthia Weil) – 3:13
8. "It's My Life" (Roger Atkins, Carl Derrico) – 3:06
9. "Inside-Looking Out" (Burdon, Chandler, Lomax, Alan Lomax) – 3:46
10. "Don't Bring Me Down" (Gerry Goffin, King) – 3:15
11. "See See Rider" (Ma Rainey) – 4:02
12. "Help Me Girl" (Scott English, Weiss) – 2:40
13. "When I Was Young" (Vic Briggs, Burdon, Barry Jenkins, Daniel McCulloch, John Weider) – 3:00
14. "San Franciscan Nights" (Briggs, Burdon, Jenkins, McCulloch, Weider) – 3:20
15. "Monterey" (Briggs, Burdon, Jenkins, McCulloch, Weider) – 4:37
16. "Sky Pilot" (Briggs, Burdon, Jenkins, McCulloch, Weider) – 7:24
17. "Ring of Fire" (June Carter Cash, Merle Kilgore) – 4:46
18. "Good Times" (Briggs, Burdon, Jenkins, McCulloch, Weider) – 3:00
19. "Coloured Rain" (Jim Capaldi, Steve Winwood, Wood) – 9:31
20. "Animal Interviews" (Burdon, Alan Price) – 4:35

== Personnel ==
- Eric Burdon – Vocals
- Hilton Valentine
- Barry Jenkins – Drums
- Chas Chandler – Bass guitar
- John Weider – Guitar, violin, bass
- Vic Briggs – Guitar
- Danny McCulloch
- John Steel – Drums
- Alan Price – Keyboard
- Zoot Money – Keyboard
- Andy Summers – Guitar
