= Animalism (album) =

Studio album by the Animals
- Released: 21 November 1966
- Recorded: 9 January, 13 April, and 4 July 1966
- Studios: Lansdowne, London; T.T.G, Hollywood
- Genre: R&B
- Length: 42:52
- Label: MGM
- Producer: Tom Wilson

The Animals US chronology
Animalization (1966)	Animalism (1966)	Eric Is Here (1967)

Animalism is the fifth American album by the Animals, released in November 1966.

== Overview ==
The album includes the band's usual repertoire of blues and R&B covers, while Frank Zappa contributed a song and played bass on two tracks. It was the last album recorded by the original incarnation of the Animals prior to their disbandment, after which singer Eric Burdon would assemble a mostly new lineup under the name "Eric Burdon and the Animals". This new version of the group was already touring when Animalism released.

The album peaked at number 33 on Billboard's Pop Albums chart. A remastered bootlegged CD edition was issued by Flawed Gems in 2014 that included 11 bonus tracks.

Professional ratings
Review scores
Source	Rating
AllMusic	5/5 stars

== Track listing ==
=== Side 1 ===
1. "All Night Long" (Frank Zappa) - 2:46
2. "Shake" (Sam Cooke) - 3:11
3. "The Other Side of This Life" (Fred Neil) - 3:30
4. "Rock Me Baby" (B.B. King, Joe Josea) - 5:23
5. "Lucille" (Albert Collins, Richard Penniman) - 2:19
6. "Smokestack Lightning" (Chester Burnett) - 5:19

=== Side 2 ===
1. "Hey Gyp" (Donovan Leitch) - 3:46
2. "Hit the Road, Jack" (Percy Mayfield) - 3:16
3. "Outcast" (Ernie Johnson, Edgar Campbell) (Album version) - 2:35
4. "Louisiana Blues" (McKinley Morganfield) - 2:37
5. "That's All I Am to You" (Otis Blackwell, Winfield Scott) - 2:08
6. "Going Down Slow" (Jimmy Oden) - 6:12

2014 CD reissue with bonus tracks (Tracks 1–12 are mono)

1. "All Night Long" (Frank Zappa) - 2:46
2. "Shake" (Sam Cooke) - 3:11
3. "The Other Side of This Life" (Fred Neil) - 3:30
4. "Rock Me Baby" (B.B. King, Joe Josea) - 5:23
5. "Lucille" (Albert Collins, Richard Penniman) - 2:19
6. "Smokestack Lightning" (Chester Burnett) - 5:19
7. "Hey Gyp" (Donovan Leitch) - 3:46
8. "Hit the Road, Jack" (Percy Mayfield) - 3:16
9. "Outcast" (Ernie Johnson, Edgar Campbell) (Album version) - 2:35
10. "Louisiana Blues" (McKinley Morganfield) - 2:37
11. "That's All I Am to You" (Otis Blackwell, Winfield Scott) - 2:08
12. "Going Down Slow" (Jimmy Oden) - 6:12
13. "C. C. Ryder" (Ma Rainey, Lena Arant) - 3:56
14. "A Love Like Yours" (Brian Holland, Lamont Dozier, Edward Holland, Jr. - 3:00
15. "Shake, Rattle, and Roll" (Charles F. Calhoun) - 3:06
16. "Tobacco Road" (John D. Loudermilk) - 4:27
17. "Roadrunner (Ellas McDaniel) - 2:48
18. "When I Was Young" (Eric Burdon, Vic Briggs, John Weider, Barry Jenkins, and Danny McCulloch) - 3:03
19. "A Love Like Yours" (Brian Holland, Lamont Dozier, Edward Holland, Jr. - 2:44
20. "Connection" (Mick Jagger and Keith Richards) - 2:23
21. "It's All Meat" - 2:09
22. "San Franciscan Nights (Eric Burdon, Vic Briggs, John Weider, Barry Jenkins, and Danny McCulloch) - 3:03
23. "All Night Long" (Frank Zappa) - 2:40

== Personnel ==
Album credited only Eric Burdon, Chas Chandler, Dave Rowberry, Hilton Valentine, Barry Jenkins, and John Steel; Globalia.net credits others listed below for tracks 1 and 3 (LP and CD). The 2014 CD reissue has asterisks for tracks 1 and 3, but no explanation of them, so Globalia.net may be correct.

The Animals

- Eric Burdon — lead vocals on 1–12
- Chas Chandler — bass guitar, vocals on 2 and 4–12
- Dave Rowberry — organ, piano on 2 and 4–12
- Hilton Valentine — guitar on 2 and 4–12
- Barry Jenkins — drums on 2 and 4–12
- John Steel — drums on 9 and 11

with:

- Frank Zappa — arrangements on 1 and 3, guitar on 1, and bass guitar on 3
- William Roberts — harmonica on 1 and guitar on 3
- Larry Knechtel — organ on 1 and 3
- Don Randi — piano on 1 and 3
- Carol Kaye — guitar on 1 and 3
- John Guerin — drums on 1 and 3

2014 CD reissue bonus tracks (13–23)

The Animals

- Eric Burdon — lead vocals
- Vic Briggs — guitar, piano
- Barry Jenkins — drums
- Danny McCulloch — bass guitar
- John Weider — guitar, violin

Technical

- Producer: Tom Wilson
- Engineers: Mack Emerman, David Greene, Ami Hadani, Adrian Kerridge, Val Valentin
- Arranger: Dave Rowberry
- Liner notes: Chas Chandler

== Charts ==
=== Album ===
Year	Chart	Position
1967	Billboard Top LPs	33
