= Finally (film) =

- Starring: Eric Burdon
- Release date: 1991

Finally (or sometimes The Animals & Beyond) is a documentary film about British singer Eric Burdon and rock band The Animals. Directed by Bill Getz, the film was released in 1991 on VHS, and in 2003 and 2008 on DVD. It features clips from 1964 to 1970 and some from 1991.

The documentary features humorous anecdotes told by Burdon, Sammy Hagar, and drummer John Steel. Other people interviewed include Chas Chandler, Zoot Money, Hilton Valentine, and Brian Auger. The film also incorporates clips of John Weider, War and Jimi Hendrix.

The film shows live recordings of "See See Rider", "Talkin' 'Bout You", "Hey Gyp (Dig the Slowness)", "Wild Thing" (Jimi Hendrix), "Good Times", "Don't Let Me Be Misunderstood", "We Gotta Get Out of This Place", and video clips of "Monterey", "When I Was Young", "The House of the Rising Sun", "Spill the Wine" and many more. A short clip of "Don't Let Me Be Misunderstood" (performed by Burdon & Brian Auger Band) is also included.
