= Anything (Eric Burdon and the Animals song) =

Single by Eric Burdon & the Animals

from the album Winds of Change
- B-side: "It's All Meat"
- Released: March 1968
- Recorded: March 1967
- Length: 2:51 (single version); 3:19 (album version)
- Label: MGM Records
- Songwriter(s): Briggs, Burdon, Jenkins, McCulloch, Weider
- Producer(s): Tom Wilson

Eric Burdon & the Animals singles chronology
"Good Times" (1967)	"Anything" (1968)	"Monterey" (1967)

"Anything" is a song performed by Eric Burdon & the Animals in 1967. It was featured on their psychedelic rock album Winds of Change. While the singles "San Franciscan Nights", "Good Times" and the album were released, "Anything" was also released as a single, peaking #80 on the United States pop singles chart. Allmusic critic Bruce Eder described it as a "relatively straightforward, brooding, moody rocker." Billboard described the single as an "intriguing rock ballad with an equally compelling lyric." Cash Box said it was "slow rock with a tasteful touch of soul" with "stunning string lines" and a "melancholy Burdon vocal."

The song is credited to Vic Briggs, Eric Burdon, Barry Jenkins, Danny McCulloch and John Weider. In a 2010 interview, Burdon identified it as one that he was proud of writing. He described it as a "love-generation song". He explained; "It's more than just a song about a love for your woman; it's about love for everything, from the Earth, to your friends, and even your enemies."
