= The Twain Shall Meet =

Studio album by Eric Burdon and the Animals
- Released: May 1968 (US); June 1968 (UK)
- Recorded: December 1967
- Genre: Psychedelic rock
- Length: 43:11; 60:33 (2004 UK Reissue)
- Label: MGM
- Producer: Tom Wilson

Eric Burdon & The Animals UK chronology
Winds of Change (1967)	The Twain Shall Meet (1968)	Love Is (1968)

Eric Burdon & The Animals US chronology
Winds of Change (1967)	The Twain Shall Meet (1968)	Every One of Us (1968)

The Twain Shall Meet is the second album by Eric Burdon & the Animals. It was released in 1968 on MGM Records.

== Background ==
The record includes "Sky Pilot", an anti-war song of the Vietnam War era, and "Monterey", the band's tribute to the 1967 Monterey Pop Festival. Reviewer Bruce Eder of AllMusic describes the song "All Is One" as "unique in the history of pop music as a psychedelic piece, mixing bagpipes, sitar, oboes, horns, flutes, and a fairly idiotic lyric, all within the framework of a piece that picks up its tempo like the dance music from Zorba the Greek while mimicking the Spencer Davis Group's "Gimme Some Lovin'".

The Twain Shall Meet peaked at No. 79 on the U.S. Billboard Top LPs during a twenty nine-week stay on the chart.

Professional ratings
Review scores
Source	Rating
AllMusic	link
Rolling Stone	(negative)

== Track listing ==
=== Side one ===
1. "Monterey" (4:39)
2. "Just the Thought" (3:47)
3. "Closer to the Truth" (4:31)
4. "No Self Pity" (4:50)
5. "Orange and Red Beams" (3:45)

=== Side two ===
1. "Sky Pilot" (7:24)
2. "We Love You Lil" (6:48)
3. "All Is One" (7:45)

=== Bonus Tracks (2004 Repertoire UK Reissue) ===
1. "Sky Pilot (Part 1)" (single version) (4:22)
2. "Sky Pilot (Part 2)" (single version) (3:02)
3. "Monterey" (single version) (4:24)
4. "Anything" (single version) (2:48)
5. "It's All Meat" (single version) (2:04)

All selections written by Eric Burdon, Vic Briggs, John Weider, Barry Jenkins, & Danny McCulloch except "Orange and Red Beams", written by McCulloch.

== Personnel ==
- Eric Burdon - vocals (1, 3, 4, 6, 8)
- John Weider - guitar, violin
- Vic Briggs - guitar
- Danny McCulloch - bass, vocals (2, 5)
- Barry Jenkins - drums

== Charts ==
Chart (1968)	Peak position
US Billboard Top LPs	79
