= Sky Pilot (song) =

1968 single by Eric Burdon & the Animals

- Single picture sleeve, 1968

Single by Eric Burdon & the Animals

from the album The Twain Shall Meet
- A-side: "Sky Pilot (Part One)"
- B-side: "Sky Pilot (Part Two)"
- Released: January 1968 (UK); May 1968 (US)
- Recorded: 1967
- Genre: Psychedelic rock
- Length: 7:27 (album); 2:55 (single Part 1); 4:30 (single Part 2)
- Label: MGM 1373 (UK); MGM K13939 (US)
- Songwriters: Eric Burdon; Vic Briggs; John Weider; Barry Jenkins; Danny McCulloch
- Producer: Tom Wilson

Eric Burdon & the Animals UK singles chronology
| "Monterey" (1967) | "Sky Pilot" (1968) | "White Houses" (1968) |

Eric Burdon & the Animals US singles chronology
| "Good Times" (1967) | "Sky Pilot" (1968) | "Monterey" (1968) |

"Sky Pilot" is a 1968 song by Eric Burdon & the Animals, released on the album The Twain Shall Meet. When released as a single the song was split across both sides, due to its length (7:27). As "Sky Pilot (Parts 1 & 2)" it reached number 14 on the U.S. pop charts, number 15 on the Canadian RPM chart, number 7 on Canada's CHUM Chart and number 40 on the UK singles chart.

The US single version on MGM was released in both Mono and Stereo versions. The latter was labeled with the phrase 'Saturation Sound'. Also present was echo effects on the line 'How high can you fly' and a trail off of bagpipes at the end of Part One. The unique mix is unavailable on current editions of the Animals compilations.

== Themes ==
"Sky pilot" refers to a military chaplain, and the song is a balladic story about a chaplain who blesses a body of troops just before they set out on an overnight raid or patrol, and then retires to await their return.

"Sky Pilot" is organized into three movements: an introduction, a programmatic interlude, and a conclusion.

The introduction begins with a verse sung a cappella and solo by Eric Burdon. Thereafter the band joins in with instruments for the chorus. Several verse-chorus iterations follow, leaving the story with the "boys" gone to battle and the Sky Pilot retired to his bed. The verses are musically lean, dominated by the vocal and a pulsing bass guitar, with a strummed acoustic guitar and drum mixed in quietly.

The interlude starts as a guitar solo, but the guitar is quickly submerged under a montage of battle sounds. First come the frightening sounds of an airstrike with the "Jericho Trumpet" sirens of Junkers Ju 87 Stuka; then the airstrike and rock band fade into the sounds of shouting, gunfire, and bagpipes. Near the end of the interlude the battle sounds fade, briefly leaving the bagpipes playing alone before the third movement begins. The bagpipe music is a performance by the Royal Scots Dragoon Guards playing "All The Blue Bonnets Are Over the Border". According to an unverified story, the pipers were recorded covertly by Burdon, resulting in the government of the United Kingdom sending the band a letter of complaint.

The conclusion begins with the return of the bass and strummed acoustic guitar, accompanied by strings. After a few measures the verses resume, but with a quieter, melancholy atmosphere: one verse is sung along with bass, guitar, and strings, and then without a choral break a final verse is sung to bass, guitar, and woodwinds. During those last verses, the "Soldiers of God" had done well defeating the enemies, for the aid of their country, however, the returning soldiers return, with tears in their eyes, having second thoughts about their mission. One of the returning soldiers feels more disturbed, with the smells of death, when he looks upon the Sky Pilot, remembering the commandment: "Thou shalt not kill". Finally a strong bass line announces the return of the chorus, now accompanied with strings, horns and piccolos, repeated several times as it fades, with the repeated section that the Sky Pilot can never reach the sky, no matter how high he flies. The instrumental section is that of a military funeral march. The musical effect is very upbeat, in stark contrast with the "downer" content of the movement's lyrics.

== Reception ==
Billboard described the single as an "unusual piece of lyric material set to a pulsating rock beat" that "has all the earmarks of another out and out smash." Cash Box called the song a "a building, bluesy effort" that was the group's "strongest outing in quite some time." It was the group's final Top 40 Billboard hit.

== Special effects ==
Besides the use of "found sound" in the interlude section, and heavy use of reverb and echos, the song is notable for its use of flanging, the swept "whooshing" sound effect laid over the entire track, most prominently during the chorus sections.

== Covers ==
The song has been covered by several artists and is still played in live shows by Eric Burdon. It is included on several of Burdon's live albums and is featured in his 1999 concert film "Live at the Coachhouse". Burdon performed a somewhat-Power Metal version on his album "The Official Live Bootleg 2000".

The song was covered by the Peruvian rock group Traffic Sound, in English in 1969. It was featured in full in their debut album, Vamos a Bailar Go Go, and the opening hymn also appeared as the introduction to one of the songs in their album Virgin.

The song was covered by MacTalla Mor on their 2007 album Jacob's Ladder, in the song "Stairway to Grace".

It was sampled by Sebadoh during a segue between the songs "Sexual Confusion" and "Three Times A Day" on their 1990 album, Weed Forestin'.

== See also ==
- List of anti-war songs
