= Winds of Change (Eric Burdon & the Animals album) =

Studio album by Eric Burdon & the Animals
- Released: October 1967
- Recorded: February–August 1967
- Genre: Psychedelic rock; experimental; narrative; progressive pop
- Length: 44:29
- Label: MGM
- Producer: Tom Wilson

Eric Burdon & the Animals UK chronology
Animalisms (1966)	Winds of Change (1967)	The Twain Shall Meet (1968)

Eric Burdon & the Animals US chronology
Eric Is Here (1967)	Winds of Change (1967)	The Twain Shall Meet (1968)

Singles from Winds of Change
- 1. "Good Times" Released: August 1967; 2. "San Franciscan Nights" Released: August 1967

Winds of Change is the debut album by British-American band Eric Burdon & the Animals, released in October 1967 by MGM Records. The album was recorded following the 1966 dissolution of the original group the Animals and singer Eric Burdon's move to Los Angeles, where he and drummer Barry Jenkins formed the new Animals lineup with musicians Vic Briggs, Danny McCulloch and John Weider. The album was produced by Tom Wilson and arranged by Briggs in sessions that spanned several months.

Eschewing the blues and R&B sound of the Animals, Winds of Change moves Burdon and the group into psychedelic territory. It is a diverse and experimental album that features Burdon reciting lyrics and stories in spoken word to sparse, psychedelic backings. The singer dedicated the album to a range of musicians. On release, the album missed the UK Albums Chart but reached number 42 on the US Billboard Top LPs. Two singles, "Good Times" and "San Franciscan Nights", were British hits, while the latter was also a US Top 10 hit. Music critics have been divided on the merits of the album, which has been re-released several times.

== Background and recording ==
The original band, the Animals, broke up in late 1966 following numerous personnel changes that saw many members being replaced. Following this, singer Eric Burdon moved from England to San Francisco and released a new album, Eric Is Here (March 1967), credited to "Eric Burdon & the Animals", though its musical personnel consisted of orchestral musicians from the Benny Golson Orchestra. Instead, Winds of Change was the first true album by Eric Burdon & the Animals. The lineup was entirely different from the Animals except for Burdon and drummer Barry Jenkins – the latter of whom had joined when John Steel left in 1966 – who were joined by guitarist Vic Briggs, bassist Danny McCulloch, and guitarist/electric violinist John Weider.

Recorded between February–August 1967, Winds of Change was produced by Tom Wilson (known for his work with Bob Dylan, the Mothers of Invention and Simon & Garfunkel) and arranged by Briggs. In December 1967, Billboard reported that the lengthy recording sessions for the album were representative of pop music becoming "serious" music, noting that produces and performers "are spending longer hours in the studio seeking for artistic triumphs as well as commercial success – and there is evidence that the two go hand-in-hand. Discussing the recording, the magazine wrote that Wilson "spent long hours in April through July in three different cities around the world to come up with the finished product. The release of the album was preceded by several non-album singles that showcased the group's new direction, such as "When I Was Young" (May 1967).

== Composition ==
=== Style and themes ===
Winds of Change is an experimental album that departs from the Animals' predominately blues style, with Burdon's move to California and the lineup change having inspired a musical transition from rhythm and blues to psychedelic rock. Indeed, the record is considered the Animals' first genuinely psychedelic album, following the advancement of Burdon's drug experiences several months earlier with his first acid trip. The group's "rave-ups" are replaced with "almost spoken word pieces with sparse instrumentation", with the record being characterised by semi-spoken stories set against rhythms or psychedelic drones. Music critic Valerie Mabbs said the album is often "best described as narrative set to music". The record is diverse, sporting "philosophic lyrics and poetic narratives ('Winds of Change,' 'The Black Plague') and personal confessions by Burdon ('Good Times')." According to critic Bruce Eder, Winds of Change is divided into two distinct sides, the first containing the more conceptual and adventurous "psychedelic mood pieces" and the second comprising more conventionally structured songs based in hard, bluesy rock comparable to Jimi Hendrix. Among the instruments that the album introduces to the group's sound are the sitar and electric violin.

In a contemporary interview, Burdon commented that Winds of Change is "dedicated to love and humanity" and to "everybody in the music business from the turn of the century to today–the people whom I think have left an important mark", citing Robert Johnson, Chick Webb, King Oliver, the Beatles, the Rolling Stones and Hendrix. Describing the record, he stated: "It sounds big-headed, but it is on the verge of creating ultimate music. From the cover to every track and every sound – it's all for everybody. I suppose every musician wants to give himself away, but this is how I feel about the album." He rejected notions that he had abandoned blues, considering the record to present the "blues of my mind, 1967 blues".

=== Songs ===
The opening title track is a folky psychedelic rock song with highly echoed guitar, sitar, electric violin and sound effects, including washing waves, while Burdon's spoken word vocals are drenched in reverb. The musician's calmly recited lyrics are a list of his influences, ranging from 1950s jazz singers to Frank Zappa, among other major figures in rock, jazz and blues; Burdon had previously worked with Zappa on "The Other Side of This Life" (1966). "Poem by the Sea" is another recitation by Burdon, delivered "amid a swirl of echo-drenched instruments" The only cover version on the album is of the Rolling Stones' "Paint It Black", which the Animals had performed at the Monterey International Pop Festival in June 1967; Tom Wilson released it against the band's wishes, although Burdon later re-recorded it for The Black-Man's Burdon (1970), his last collaborative album with American group War. The Winds of Change version is characterised by Weider's electric violin, Briggs' guitar and Burdon's lengthy vocal improvisation. "The Black Plague", another track built around Burdon's surreal spoken vocals, begins with a Gregorian chant section that has been compared to the Yardbirds' "Still I'm Sad" (1965). It has been referred to it as a "gothic drama", while Burdon himself described it "a blues about the Bubonic Plague of the 14th century."

"Yes I Am Experienced" was one of the first answer songs; it was written in response to Hendrix's "Are You Experienced?", which had not yet been released when Burdon's answer song was recorded. Containing more spoken word vocals, the track also incorporates a change of tempo mid-way through. A folk pop song, "San Franciscan Nights" moves from a heavy electric intro to a calmer, acoustic section in which Burdon's spoken lyrics refer to the counterculture of San Francisco, in what has been described as the singer's "joyous celebration of the West Coast psychedelic scene". The lengthy "Man-Woman" is centred on Jenkins' percussion and Burdon's lyrics, referencing nights of drug use, which the singer delivers in a scansion that has been compared to rap. "Hotel Hell" features social commentary and "moody-late night street imagery" in an arrangement reminiscent evocative of jazz-rock, with mariachi-style trumpet. An autobiographical song, "Good Times" is characterised by Weider's violin while Burdon "considers the good times that he wasted having good times", while the gentle "Anything" is another exercise in social commentary. The closing song, "It's All Meat" is a driving rock song influenced by Hendrix with lyrics from Burdon that mention Eric Clapton and Muhammed Ali.

== Release and promotion ==
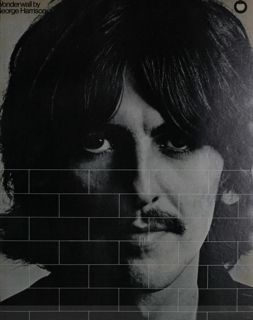
George Harrison (1968), to whom Winds of Change is partly dedicated

Winds of Change was released in October 1967 by MGM Records. As listed on the sleeve, Burdon dedicated the album to numerous people. Among them is George Harrison of the Beatles, whose espousal of Hindu philosophy following a visit to India the previous year Burdon cited as an inspiration. Writers have highlighted the Harrison dedication in particular, which reads: "From whom I learn from being in the same room". A UK release followed on November 1, 1967.

The album's first single, "Good Times", was released in August 1967 with "Ain't That So" as the B-side. It peaked at number 20 on the UK Singles Chart, where it spent eleven weeks. The following single was "San Franciscan Nights", with "Good Times" as the American B-side and "Gratefully Dead" as the British B-side. The song reached number seven on the UK Singles Chart where it spent ten weeks, and number nine on the US Billboard Hot 100, becoming the New Animals' only transatlantic Top 10 hit. However, Winds of Change missed the UK Albums Chart on release, but reached number 42 on the US Billboard Top LPs chart.

In 1969, Winds of Change was re-released in Holland. In the UK, it was re-released by MGM in 1971, by which point Burdon had achieved renewed fame through his collaborations with War. CD versions of the album include those released by One Way Records in 1995, Repertoire Records in 2003 and 2006, Spectrum Music in 2004, Rev-Ola Records in 2008 and Universal in 2013. The 2008 release features sleeve notes from David Wells and adds bonus tracks, namely two alternate mixes and the rock songs "Ain't That So" and "Gratefully Dead". In 2020, Eric Burdon & the Animals' MGM work was re-released by Esoteric Recordings as the box set When I Was Young: The MGM Recordings, featuring a remastered stereo version of Winds of Change on its first disc and a mono version on its fifth disc.

== Critical reception ==
=== Contemporary reviews ===
In a contemporary review, Alan Jones of Lincolnshire Echo described Winds of Change as "one of the most individual albums for many months." He stated that while there are no dramatic innovations, all of the songs still exude conviction, and added: "Mr. Burdon is genuinely treating his music as a personal crusade for a better world, and at the same time being entertaining." Record World deemed the album "a good one" and wrote that the package "is designed to stress the new bag Eric Burdon and his new Animals are in", saying: "It's very timely and the teen fans will cotton to it." A reviewer for Cash Box described the album as "eleven rock outings on a potent package" and predicted it would have "monster" success. Billboard wrote that the Animals not only keep pace with changes in pop but "even bolt ahead", and considered the record to fuse "love generation" music with "bitter, caustic comments on contemporary life."

The pop panel for Melody Maker described the music as "very good", drawing attention to the meaningful, if sombre lyrics and the "sensational" music by the New Animals. However, they dismissed Burdon's sleeve notes as pretentious and criticised his album dedications to George Harrison and "all the lads at West Central", as well as him "telling us he loves us"; they stated that these are Burdon's personal problems and that "we only care about the music". They concluded: "Keep punching out the music and leave us to think our own thoughts". Mike Ledgerwood of Disc & Music Echo considered Burdon to have "gone overboard" in what he describes as "often boring, narrative-type numbers", despite praising the singer for being progressive. However, he selected it as one of the magazine's "albums of the month" due to its rejection of commercialism; he wrote of the band: "They're true believers. They know their inner feelings, what they want, and how to get it–irrespective of others", and added that listeners would either love the album as a piece of "musical and pop progression", or loathe its abandonment of the Animals' earlier style.

Pete Johnson of The Los Angeles Times reviewed it alongside Captain Beefheart and His Magic Band's Safe as Milk, describing them both as experimental albums that depart from their makers' mainly blues stylings. However, they considered the Animals' record to ably demonstrate "the dangers of novelty", deeming it a "terrible album insufficiently brightened by a few good numbers". They panned the "semi-coherent" liner notes, lyrical inanities, "wind-blasted echoey narration" on the title song and "flower child exploitation" of "San Francisco Nights", and added that while Burdon can be a great singer, it was unfortunate that his "past success apparently has deluded him into thinking he is a person of many talents, which he is not."

=== Retrospective appraisal ===
Professional ratings
Review scores
Source	Rating
AllMusic	2.5/5 stars
Encyclopedia of Popular Music	3/5 stars
Record Collector	3/5 stars

In 1969, Rory O'Connor of The Tampa Tribune argued that the "petty pretentious" album represented the start of Burdon's creative downfall, adding that although the singer's new band were good, most of the material was "terrible". Reviewing the 1971 reissue, Valerie Mabbs of Record Mirror commented that most of the album's content is "pretty poor narrative" and found it hard to take the record sincerely, concluding that "with the current enthusiasm over War, [the album] was best left where it was." However, in the Salem Press book Popular Musicians Volume 1 (1999), Winds of Change is considered "perhaps [the Animals'] high-water mark." Reviewing the album for AllMusic, Bruce Eder highlighted it for opening the group's "psychedelic era" and commented that "It's All Meat" calls to mind "an aspect of this band that a lot of scholars in earlier years overlooked – the fact that Briggs, Weider, et al. had the skills to make music in [a Hendrix-esque] style that was convincing and that worked on record, on their terms."

Kingsley Abbott of Record Collector wrote that aside from the singles "Good Times" and "San Franciscan Nights", which he described as "deservedly" evocative of the summer of 1967, the record is otherwise "a decidedly left-field, semi-spoken album of freaker stories set against rhythmic tracks or psychy drones... which will be OK for some, but not all." He said that besides the two singles, the only other highlights are "Hotel Hell" and "It's All Meat", the latter possessing "some attack and variety" lacking elsewhere on the record. Also for Record Collector, Jon Harrington praised the album's "superb" sound and the skilled and inventive musicianship, but considered the record to be patchy. He found the spoken-word monologues to be "dated and misjudged", but praised the singles and several other songs which he said "show that the album could have been much better had the experimentation been reined in and more made of Burdon's singing."

In 2017, Uncut ranked the album at number 80 in their list of "The 101 Weirdest Albums of All Time"; contributor Jim Wirth called Burdon the "Jimmy Pursey of psychedelic rock", commenting that his move to California resulted in "one of pop's great voyages of delusion, with Burdon's four San Francisco albums with his American Animals a hobnail-booted approximation of flower power". He added that "The Black Plague", "Yes I Am Experienced" and "San Franciscan Nights" exemplify "a premature mid-life crisis set to music". Also in 2017, BrooklynVegan ranked Winds of Change at number 44 in their list of "The 50 best psychedelic rock albums of the Summer of Love". In 2022, Uncut ranked the album at number 346 in their list of "The 500 Greatest Albums of the 1960s".

== Track listing ==
All songs written by Eric Burdon, Vic Briggs, John Weider, Barry Jenkins, Danny McCulloch, except where noted.

=== Side one ===
1. "Winds of Change" – 3:59
2. "Poem by the Sea" – 2:15
3. "Paint It Black" (Mick Jagger, Keith Richards) – 5:57
4. "The Black Plague" – 5:58
5. "Yes I Am Experienced" – 3:38

=== Side two ===
6. "San Franciscan Nights" – 3:18
7. "Man—Woman" – 5:29
8. "Hotel Hell" – 4:46
9. "Good Times" – 2:58
10. "Anything" – 3:19
11. "It's All Meat" – 2:01

=== Bonus tracks (2003 reissue) ===
12. "When I Was Young" – 2:59
13. "A Girl Named Sandoz" (UK Single B-Side) (Burdon, Weider) – 3:05
14. "Good Times" (single version) – 2:58
15. "Ain't That So" – 3:27
16. "San Franciscan Nights" (single version) – 3:19
17. "Gratefully Dead" – 3:59

== Personnel ==
Adapted from the liner notes of Winds of Change, except where noted.

Eric Burdon & the Animals

- Eric Burdon – vocals, liner notes
- Vic Briggs – guitar, piano, arrangements
- John Weider – guitar, violin
- Danny McCulloch – bass
- Barry Jenkins – drums

Additional personnel

- Keith Olsen – "stepped in on some tracks to deputise on bass after Danny McCulloch broke his wrist"
- Tom Wilson – production
- Val Valentin – director of engineering
- Ami Hadani – recording engineer
- Ed Kramer – recording engineer, remix engineer
- Gary Kellgren – remix engineer

== Charts ==
Chart (1967)	Peak position
US Billboard Top LPs	42
