= Every One of Us =

Studio album by Eric Burdon & The Animals
- Released: August 1968
- Recorded: June 1968
- Genre: Psychedelic blues
- Length: 45:56
- Label: MGM
- Producer: "Every one of us" (as credited in the liner notes)

Eric Burdon & The Animals U.S. chronology
The Twain Shall Meet (1968)	Every One of Us (1968)	Love Is (1968)

Every One of Us is the third album by Eric Burdon & The Animals. It was released in 1968 on MGM Records.

== Background ==
Every One of Us was the second of three albums released by the band in the United States in that year (the album was not released in the United Kingdom). The single from the album was "White Houses", which charted in the United States and Canada. The album combines several styles such as blues, folk rock, and raga rock, while the track "Year of the Guru" is notable for its early use of rapping vocals.

At the time of the release of the album in August 1968, both Danny McCulloch and Vic Briggs had been fired from the band earlier that summer, and Eric Burdon was seeking replacement musicians. Unlike the previous two albums, involving shared songwriting credits with band members, Every One of Us is primarily compositions solely credited to Eric Burdon.

== Critical reception ==
Billboard described this album as "Another fine album by Eric Burdon, and the Animals." Bruce Eder of Allmusic described it as "a good psychedelic blues album, filled with excellent musicianship." All Music Guide gave an unfavorable review of the album, describing it as "A rather spare and disappointing album, recorded amid the splintering of the original New Animals.

== Track listing ==
Professional ratings
Review scores
Source	Rating
Allmusic	3.5/5 stars
All Music Guide	(unfavorable)
Billboard	(favorable)

=== Side One ===
No.	Title	Writer(s)	Length
1.	"White Houses"	Eric Burdon	3:46
2.	"Uppers and Downers"	Eric Burdon	0:24
3.	"Serenade to a Sweet Lady"	John Weider	6:13
4.	"The Immigrant Lad"	Eric Burdon	6:13
5.	"Year of the Guru"	Eric Burdon	5:24
Total length:			22:00

=== Side Two ===
No.	Title	Writer(s)	Length
1.	"St. James Infirmary"	Traditional, arranged by Eric Burdon	5:03
2.	"New York 1963 - America 1968"	Eric Burdon, Zoot Money	18:53
Total length:			23:56

== Personnel ==
Eric Burdon & The Animals

- Eric Burdon - vocals (except track 3)
- Vic Briggs - guitar, bass
- John Weider - guitar, celeste
- Danny McCulloch - bass, vocals, 12-string guitar
- Barry Jenkins - drums
- Zoot Money (credited as "George Bruno") - Hammond organ, vocals, piano

== Charts ==
Chart (1968)	Peak position
US Billboard Top LPs	152
