= Love Is (The Animals album) =

Studio album by Eric Burdon and the Animals
- Released: December 1968 (US) and May 1969 (UK)
- Recorded: October 1968
- Studios: TTG (Los Angeles); Sunset Sound (Hollywood)
- Genres: Psychedelic rock; R&B; progressive rock
- Length: 66:32
- Label: MGM
- Producer: The Animals

Eric Burdon and the Animals, UK chronology
The Twain Shall Meet (1968)	Love Is (1968)

Eric Burdon and the Animals, US chronology
Every One of Us (1968)	Love Is (1968)	The Greatest Hits of Eric Burdon and The Animals (1969)

Professional ratings
Review scores
Source	Rating
Allmusic	3/5 stars

Love Is is the fourth album by Eric Burdon and the Animals. It was released in 1968 as a double album.

== Background ==
Love Is was issued in both the United Kingdom and United States. It was the last album released before the Animals' second dissolution in 1968. An edited version of the track "Ring of Fire" was released as a single and peaked at No. 35 in the UK singles chart, breaking the top 40 in Germany, Holland, and Australia as well.

Aside from the self-penned "I'm Dying (or am I?)", the album consists entirely of cover songs with extended arrangements by the Animals and sometimes even additional lyrics and musical sections. The entire Side D is occupied by a medley of songs originally by Dantalian's Chariot, a former group of band members Zoot Money and Andy Summers. Dantalian's Chariot archivists have been unable to locate a recording of "Gemini", and it is possible that Eric Burdon and the Animals were the first to actually record the song.

This album captured the only studio work of future Police guitarist Andy Summers with the group. The recording of Traffic's "Colored Rain" includes a guitar solo by Summers which runs a full 4 minutes and 15 seconds. To ensure he ended at the right place, Zoot Money kept count throughout the solo and gave him the cue out at bar 189.

== Track listing (MGM, USA) ==
=== Side one ===
1. "River Deep, Mountain High" (Phil Spector, Jeff Barry, Ellie Greenwich) – 7:23
2. "I'm an Animal" (Sylvester Stewart) – 5:34
3. "I'm Dying (Or Am I?)" (Eric Burdon) – 4:28

=== Side two ===
4. "Ring of Fire" (June Carter, Merle Kilgore) – 4:58
5. "Coloured Rain" (Steve Winwood, Jim Capaldi, Chris Wood) – 9:38

=== Side three ===
6. "To Love Somebody" (Barry Gibb, Robin Gibb) – 6:55
7. "As the Years Go Passing By" (Deadric Malone) – 10:13

=== Side four ===
8. "Gemini" (Steve Hammond) / "Madman Running Through the Fields" [listed as "The Madman"] (Zoot Money, Andy Summers) – 17:23

== Personnel ==
Eric Burdon & The Animals

- Eric Burdon — lead vocals, spoken word
- Zoot Money — bass, backing and co-lead (3, 8a) vocals, organ, piano, spoken word (8a)
- Andy Summers — guitar, backing vocals
- John Weider — guitar, violin, backing vocals
- Barry Jenkins — drums, percussion, backing vocals

with:

- Robert Wyatt — backing vocals (1)

== Album versions ==
LP
1968, MGM SE 4591-2, U.S.A.
1968, MGM U.K.

== Charts ==
Chart (1969)	Peak position
US Billboard Top LPs	123
