= Monterey (Eric Burdon and the Animals song) =

- Australia sleeve art

Single by Eric Burdon & The Animals

from the album The Twain Shall Meet
- B-side: "Ain't That So" (USA), "Anything" (UK)
- Released: 30 December 1967
- Recorded: 1967
- Genre: Psychedelic pop
- Length: 4:21 (Single Version)
- Label: MGM
- Songwriters: Burdon, Briggs, Weider, Jenkins, McCulloch
- Producer: Tom Wilson

Eric Burdon & The Animals singles chronology
"Anything" (1967)	"Monterey" (1967)	"Sky Pilot" (1968)

"Monterey" is a 1967 song by Eric Burdon & The Animals. The music and lyrics were composed by the group's members, Eric Burdon, John Weider, Vic Briggs, Danny McCulloch, and Barry Jenkins. The song provides an oral account of the June 1967 Monterey Pop Festival, at which the Animals performed. Burdon namedrops several of the acts who performed at the festival such as the Byrds, Jefferson Airplane, the Who, the Grateful Dead, and Jimi Hendrix. In 1968, two different video clips of the song were aired.

== Background ==
Eric Burdon and the Animals performed at the 1967 Monterey Pop Festival at the peak of the Summer of Love; they followed Johnny Rivers onstage and were introduced by Chet Helms. In his book, Monterey Pop, Joel Selvin wrote that, at the festival, "Burdon did nothing short of reinvent himself in front of the audience."

The song "Monterey" was subsequently written in tribute to the group's experiences at the festival, and proved to be one of the new band's biggest hits. The lyrics describe the atmosphere of the festival and some of the notable musicians who played, including The Byrds, Jefferson Airplane, Ravi Shankar, The Who, Hugh Masekela, The Grateful Dead, and Jimi Hendrix, as "young gods" with music "born of love" and "religion was being born." The band described a scene at which "children danced night and day", and "even the cops grooved with us." "His Majesty Prince Jones" referred to Brian Jones of the Rolling Stones, who was an MC at the event. Before the ending of the song, Burdon quoted the Byrds song "Renaissance Fair": "I think that Maybe I'm Dreamin'". Burdon mispronounces Shankar's name as "Shanknar."

The song featured a brass section as well as a string section. The longer version of the song begins with a spoken recitation by Burdon. The ending as the song is extended with the instruments dropping out, with only the sounds of a mystical instrument play before the fade.

Almost each of the musicians mentioned are represented by a corresponding instrument: Ravi Shankar by a sitar sounding electric guitar, The Who by electric guitars and drums, Hugh Masekela by a trumpet, The Grateful Dead, by electric guitars, and Jimi Hendrix by a different sounding electric guitar. The sound of a distortion of the guitars is heard when the "ten thousand electric guitars" are playing. The Strings come in on the line: "You wanna find the truth in life,/ Don't pass music by,/ And you know I would not lie", sounding like a Hindu chant.

Some radio edits omit the instrumental section, which is heard in the middle of the song, as well as shortening the ending, due to its going over the three minute limit.

== Charts ==
Released as a single in 1967, the song reached number 15 on the U.S. pop singles chart, number 16 on the Canadian RPM charts, and number 3 on Canada's CHUM Chart. It reached number 9 in Australia and number 20 in New Zealand. It did not appear as a hit in the UK, where the image of the festival was not as strong. It was included in the new band's second album The Twain Shall Meet as well as their 1969 U.S.-only compilation, The Greatest Hits of Eric Burdon and The Animals.

== Releases ==
The Mexican MGM release gives the song titles in Spanish as "Monterrey" and "No Es Mucho". Monterrey is in fact an entirely different city in Mexico.

In 1967 and 1968, the song was included on their live shows. Burdon re-recorded the song many times at his live shows, adding more and more sequences every time.

In 1993, the Eric Burdon - Brian Auger Band released it on their live album "Access All Areas". In 1999, it was featured on Eric Burdon & The New Animals' concert film Live at the Coachhouse. In 2000, the same band released another long live version, which runs for nearly eight minutes. When Burdon had a completely new band in 2006 they also performed it.

== See also ==
- Monterey Pop Festival
