= Vic Briggs =

British musician (1945–2021)

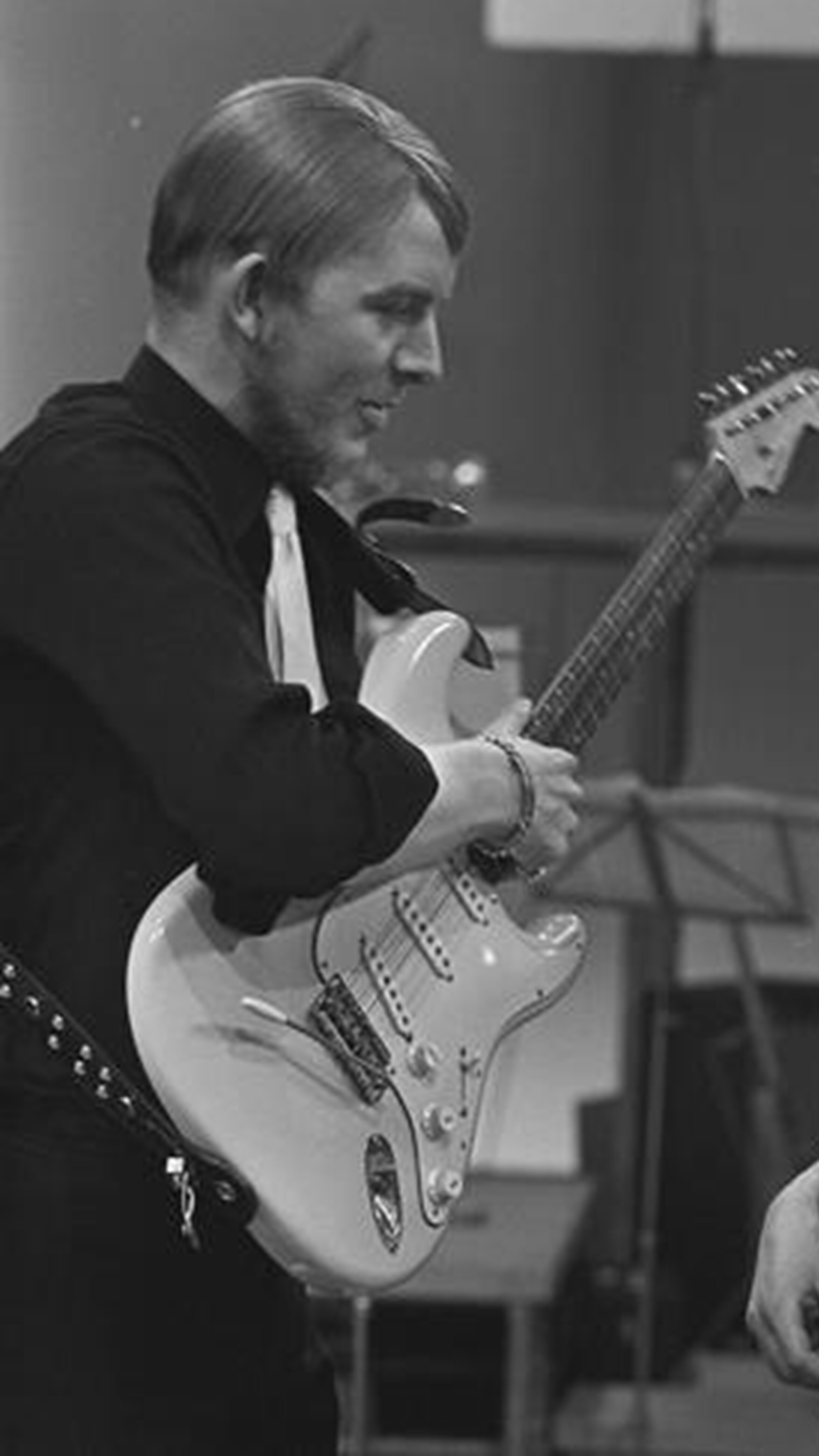
- Briggs with guitar (Dutch TV, 1967)

Background information
- Also known as: Antion; Antion Meredith; Vikram Singh Khalsa
- Born: Victor Harvey Briggs III; 14 February 1945; Twickenham, Middlesex, England
- Died: 30 June 2021 (aged 76) New Zealand
- Genres: Rock, psychedelic rock, hard rock, Hawaiian music, devotional music
- Instruments: Guitar; piano
- Years active: 1961–2021
- Formerly of: The Echoes; Dusty Springfield; Steampacket; Johnny Hallyday; Brian Auger's Trinity; Eric Burdon and The Animals
- Spouse: Kirsten Lindholm
- Website: antion.info

Victor Harvey Briggs III (14 February 1945 – 30 June 2021) was a British blues and rock musician, best known as the lead guitarist with Eric Burdon and The Animals from 1966 to 1968. Briggs, a convert to Sikhism, later played classical Indian and Hawaiian music, and adopted the name Antion Vikram Singh Meredith.

== History ==
=== Family and early career ===
Vic Briggs was born in Twickenham, Middlesex, England. He was named after his father, an American army captain who was killed in action in France in November 1944, shortly before Briggs' birth. His British mother ensured that Briggs' American citizenship was recognized, through obtaining a U.S. passport for him at an early age. She raised him with her parents in the town of Feltham, near London. Briggs attended Hampton Grammar School, where his contemporaries included Paul Samwell-Smith and Jim McCarty, later of The Yardbirds, Brian May, later of Queen and singer-actor Murray Head. In 1961, at the age of 16, Briggs met well-known British session guitarist Big Jim Sullivan, who became a mentor.

Through Sullivan, Briggs was introduced to members of The Echoes, a band that Briggs ultimately joined for three weeks in 1961, as his first engagement as a professional musician, before returning to school. During this brief period, Briggs met Rory Storm, Ringo Starr and Gerry and the Pacemakers, among other musicians, and played with The Echoes at the Cavern Club in Liverpool. Briggs continued playing with semi-professional bands upon his return to school, and also was asked to rejoin The Echoes in 1962 for an engagement as the backing band for Jerry Lee Lewis. In the summer of 1962, Briggs was playing with a band called Peter Nelson and The Travelers, members of whom would later form The Flower Pot Men and White Plains, and which briefly included Mitch Mitchell as the drummer.

Briggs' experiences as a musician conflicted with his studies and Briggs was asked not to return to Hampton Grammar School as of the commencement of the 1962–1963 academic year. During the 1962-1963 period, Briggs played throughout England, Scotland and Germany as a member of the Shel Carson Combo, which later became The Rokes upon the band's relocation to Italy, which Briggs did not participate in. A bandmate was John Weider, who would later join Briggs in Eric Burdon and The Animals, and remains a lifelong friend. While in Germany, the band had a residency at the Top Ten Club. Briggs then played in England and Germany with a number of bands throughout 1964, until being asked to rejoin The Echoes in early 1965. At that time, The Echoes had become the backup band to Dusty Springfield. As a member of The Echoes, Briggs toured with Springfield and contributed to her 1965 album Ev'rything's Coming Up Dusty, as well as performing with her at the New Musical Express 1965 awards ceremony at Wembley Arena, where Springfield won the award for World Female Singer. Briggs and the rest of The Echoes also backed Springfield on her Top 10 hit single "In The Middle of Nowhere", released in June 1965, but which was not included on the album.

During this period, Briggs befriended keyboardist Brian Auger. Later in 1965 when, with the encouragement of producer and manager Giorgio Gomelsky, Auger co-founded Steampacket, with Long John Baldry, he asked Briggs to join. Other members were Rod Stewart and Julie Driscoll on vocals, Micky Waller on drums and Richard Brown on bass. The band never formally recorded a studio or live album. Demo recordings were released in multiple versions, commencing in 1972, following Rod Stewart's later success. When Rod Stewart was fired from Steampacket and then Long John Baldry left Steampacket in 1966, the band continued as Brian Auger's Trinity, initially based in France. Briggs and Auger also participated in the recording of a Johnny Hallyday album during this period, La Génération Perdue, which resulted in a French hit single version of "Black is Black". Briggs' participation in the recording of the album is uncredited.

In September 1966, Briggs met Jimi Hendrix, shortly after Hendrix had arrived in England. Hendrix, at the suggestion and request of Chas Chandler to Brian Auger, had sat in with Brian Auger and The Trinity, including Briggs and using Briggs' equipment, at The Scotch of St. James club in London. This was one of Hendrix' first public performances in England. Later that autumn, Auger and The Trinity were backing Johnny Hallyday at an engagement at the Paris Olympia, to which Hendrix had been added as the opening act. Mike Jeffery, who managed Eric Burdon and, with Chas Chandler, co-managed Jimi Hendrix, approached Briggs at the engagement with an offer to join Burdon's new band. Briggs agreed. Briggs had been suggested to Eric Burdon and Mike Jeffery by John Weider, Briggs' former bandmate in the Shel Carson Combo, after Weider had joined Burdon's new band.

=== Eric Burdon and The Animals ===
Briggs joined Eric Burdon's reconstituted Animals, known as Eric Burdon and The Animals, in November 1966. Briggs is described by one biographer as being "the most musically adept musician ever to pass through the ranks of the Animals in either of that group's major incarnations". Between 1967 and 1968, Briggs recorded three albums with Eric Burdon and The Animals, two of which involved song co-writing credit for all members of the band. As a consequence, Briggs is credited as a co-writer of most of the hit singles of the band during this period, as well as being formally credited as the arranger of most of the singles. Briggs, who could read music, was able to develop music charts and consequently arranged much of the band's music during this period, adding horn and other instrumental parts to the songs.

In January 1967, barely a month after the band commenced performing, manager Mike Jeffrey arranged for Eric Burdon to record a song being included in the soundtrack for the Casino Royale movie, which was being written by Burt Bacharach and Hal David. Briggs had arranged the music, to the satisfaction of Bacharach and David. It was the first written arrangement by Briggs to have been recorded. Eric Burdon's lack of interest in the project, demonstrated by his lack of preparation in relation to Hal David's lyrics, caused the opportunity to be scrapped, to Briggs' significant regret. Later in 1967, "Ain't That So", co-written by Briggs and John Scott, was included in the soundtrack to the movie Stranger in the House.

Briggs considered the appearance of the band at the Monterey Pop Festival, in June 1967, as one of his most significant experiences as a musician. He regarded one of his most exciting performances as being when The Animals played at the Hollywood Bowl, in November 1967.

Briggs, along with bandmate Danny McCulloch, was fired from the band in the summer of 1968, prior to the release of Every One of Us, in August 1968. Briggs would see Eric Burdon for the last time approximately 1969.

In 1992, to the consternation of Eric Burdon, Briggs registered a U.S. trademark of "The Animals" band name, and performed under that name with former band members Danny McCulloch and Barry Jenkins. The band's most notable performance, with Phil Ryan instead of Eric Burdon on lead vocals, was a 1992 performance in Moscow's Red Square, as part of a benefit concert for victims of the Chernobyl Nuclear Disaster.

=== Later career ===
During the 1968-1969 period, Briggs, having purchased a house in Topanga Canyon and based in Los Angeles, developed a reputation as an independent arranger and producer. Since Briggs was himself a professional musician, he was considered by other musicians to have a particular sensitivity, when arranging and producing for them. He also did some session work around this time, sitting in with the Grateful Dead at Pacific Recorders in San Mateo on a band rehearsal on a rarely-played tune called Clementine, along with another session musician, one David Crosby. In May 1969, he became a staff producer and arranger at Capitol Records. During this period, he arranged and produced albums by Danny McCulloch, Zoot Money, Hilton Valentine and Sean Bonniwell, among others. None of the albums were successful, which Briggs attributed in part to the lack of support by the record company for new artists. An album was required to succeed on its own, independently of record company support. Bonniwell and his music, including the album produced and arranged by Briggs, later achieved a level of cult status.

Briggs and several other producers were fired by Capitol Records at the end of 1969, with existing projects on which they were working being discontinued. Briggs attributes his firing from Capitol Records as precipitating his decision to leave the music business, as well as the commencement of his spiritual growth. He sold all of his guitars, a decision which he later came to regret, and did not own a guitar for nineteen years thereafter. Briggs also later regretted not further developing his orchestration abilities.

Briggs first became interested in Indian music through Eric Clapton. Briggs had first met Clapton in 1966, when Briggs was a member of Steampacket and the band shared the bill with John Mayall's Bluesbreakers, where Clapton was the guitarist. Eric Clapton introduced Briggs to albums by the Dagar Brothers and Pannalal Ghosh. Briggs later purchased the 1965 album by Ravi Shankar and Ali Akbar Khan, Ravi Shankar and Ali Akbar Khan, Alla Rakha - Duets. Briggs was particularly influenced by the sarod playing of Khan, whom he describes as "one of the most emotionally expressive musicians in the world". Briggs later met Ravi Shankar at the 1967 Monterey Pop Festival, where Briggs was also performing with Eric Burdon and The Animals. Shankar's performance at the Monterey Pop Festival was the first performance of Indian classical music that Briggs had ever seen. The second performance of Indian classical music that Briggs attended was that of Ali Akbar Khan in London, later that same year. The performances of Khan and Shankar profoundly affected Briggs.

Following initial influences through attending a seminar by Baba Ram Dass (the former Richard Alpert), in January 1970 Briggs attended a Los Angeles yoga class instructed by Yogi Bhajan. Followers of Yogi Bhajan included singer Johnny Rivers. Briggs was profoundly influenced by the experience, and followed Yogi Bhajan for twenty years thereafter. In retrospect, Briggs regarded his time with Yogi Bhajan as having been cult-like in nature.

Briggs commenced studying Kundalini yoga and Nāda yoga, as well as Sikh sacred music. At the request of Yogi Bhajan, Briggs returned to England in December 1970, to open a yoga studio and to teach Kundalini yoga This was the first studio of Kundalini yoga in England.

During this period, Briggs developed further interest in Sikh religious music, and in the Sikh religion, spending much time with members of the Sikh community in London. Briggs was particularly attracted to the use of the harmonium in Sikh religious music, and commenced learning how to play it. Members of the Sikh community in London began to refer to Briggs as Vikram Singh, and were impressed with Briggs' ability to sing and play Sikh sacred music. In 1971, Briggs was formally baptized as a Sikh and chose the name Vikram, to which was added Singh Khalsa. Briggs was thereafter invited to perform at various Sikh temples throughout England. Also during this period, Briggs met and later married actress Kirsten Lindholm, who also converted to Sikhism.

At the request of Yogi Bhajan, Briggs returned to southern California from England, in the early 1970s. Briggs attended the Ali Akbar College of Music in Marin County. In 1977, Yogi Bhajan appointed Briggs and his wife as co-directors of the Guru Ram Dass Ashram, in San Diego. They continued in that capacity until 1990, when they left Yogi Bhajan. The involvement in the Sikh community of Briggs and his wife continued to grow; Briggs became one of the founding members of the Sikh temple in San Diego. Briggs and his wife left Yogi Bhajan based on a dispute over whether the equity in the temple should belong to the local membership or to the central leadership. During this period, Briggs also had a plumbing business in San Diego.

In 1979, Briggs performed Sikh religious music throughout northern India and was the first non-Indian to perform kirtan at Harimandir Sahib (also called the Golden Temple of Amritsar), which was a very powerful religious moment for him. Briggs subsequently recorded several albums of Indian music. with a particular focus on the Gurbani kirtan, being representations of hymns from Sikh scriptures generally set to ragas.

Briggs kept a degree of distance from Sikh social settings: "Sikhi spoke to my soul. Gurbani still speaks to my soul. I just prefer not to be involved much with Sikhs, Indian or American, because of the political considerations that are always present."

The name Antion, which Briggs adopted as a stage name, came to Briggs following his observation of a solar eclipse above the ocean, from a beach at Del Mar, in 1992.

In 1993, Briggs and his family relocated to the Hawaiian island of Kauai. While in Hawaii, Briggs had a radio show for a period of time. During an earlier stopover in Hawaii, Briggs heard and developed an interest in the music of the Brothers Cazimero. Following his move to Hawaii, Briggs developed an interest in and commenced performing Hawaiian chant music, following study under Blaine Kia.

In 2003, Briggs provided an invited review of Sick of Being Me, a novel by Sean Egan, a novelist and journalist with a number of publications in relation to the music industry. The novel concerned the challenges to a struggling musician in the 1990s.

In 2008, Briggs and his family relocated to New Zealand, the country of his wife's early years, where Briggs, known as Antion Meredith, and his wife of over forty years, known as Elandra Kirsten Meredith, became yoga instructors.

=== Death ===
He died from cancer in 2021.

== Discography ==
=== As Antion ===
- 2007 One in the Goddess
- 2007 Live on Kauai

=== As Antion Vikram Singh ===
Sources:

- Sacred Songs of the Sikhs
- Jaap Saahib
- Evening Raga
- Cherdi Kala
- Asa di Var

=== Eric Burdon and The Animals ===
==== Albums ====
- 1968 Every One of Us
- 1967 The Twain Shall Meet
- 1967 Winds of Change

==== Singles ====
- 1968 White Houses/Anything; River Deep, Mountain High
- 1968 Sky Pilot/Sky Pilot (Pt. 2)
- 1967 Monterey/Anything (UK), Ain't That So (US)
- 1967 Anything/It's All Meat
- 1967 Good Times/Ain't That So
- 1967 San Franciscan Nights/Good Times (U.S.); Gratefully Dead (U.K.)
- 1967 When I Was Young/ A Girl Named Sandoz

=== With Johnny Hallyday ===
==== Album ====
- 1966 La Génération Perdue

==== Single ====
- 1966 Black is Black ("Noir, C'est Noir")

=== Steampacket ===
- 1977 The Steampacket - The First Supergroup (Charly)
- 1972 Rock Generation Volume 6 - The Steampacket (BYG)

=== With Dusty Springfield ===
==== Album ====
- 1965 Ev'rything's Coming Up Dusty

==== Single ====
- 1965 In The Middle of Nowhere/Baby Don't You Know

=== As Producer, Arranger ===
==== Sean Bonniwell ====
===== Album =====
- 1969 Close (Capitol)

===== Single =====
- 1969 Where Am I To Go/Sleep

==== Mark Eric ====
===== Album =====
- 1969 A Midsummer's Day Dream (Revue)

===== Singles =====
- 1969 Night of The Lions/Don't Cry Over Me
- 1969 Where Do The Girls of Summer Go/California Home

==== Future ====
===== Album =====
- 1969 Down That Country Road (Shamley)

===== Singles =====
- 1969 Raggedy Jack/Love Is All You've Got
- 1969 Thank You Father, Thank You Mother/Love Is All You've Got

==== Danny McCulloch ====
===== Album =====
- 1969 Wings of A Man (Capitol)

===== Singles =====
- 1969 Wings of A Man/Orange and Red Beams
- 1969 Hope/Hold On

==== Tina and David Meltzer ====
- 1998 Green Morning (RD Records; originally arranged and produced by Vic Briggs in 1969.)

==== Zoot Money ====
- 1969 Welcome To My Head (Capitol)>

==== Surf Symphony ====
===== Album =====
- 1969 Song of Summer (Capitol)

===== Single =====
- 1969 Night of The Lions/That Bluebird of Summer

==== Hilton Valentine ====
- 1970 All In Your Head (Capitol)
