= Danny McCulloch =

British bassist (1945–2015)

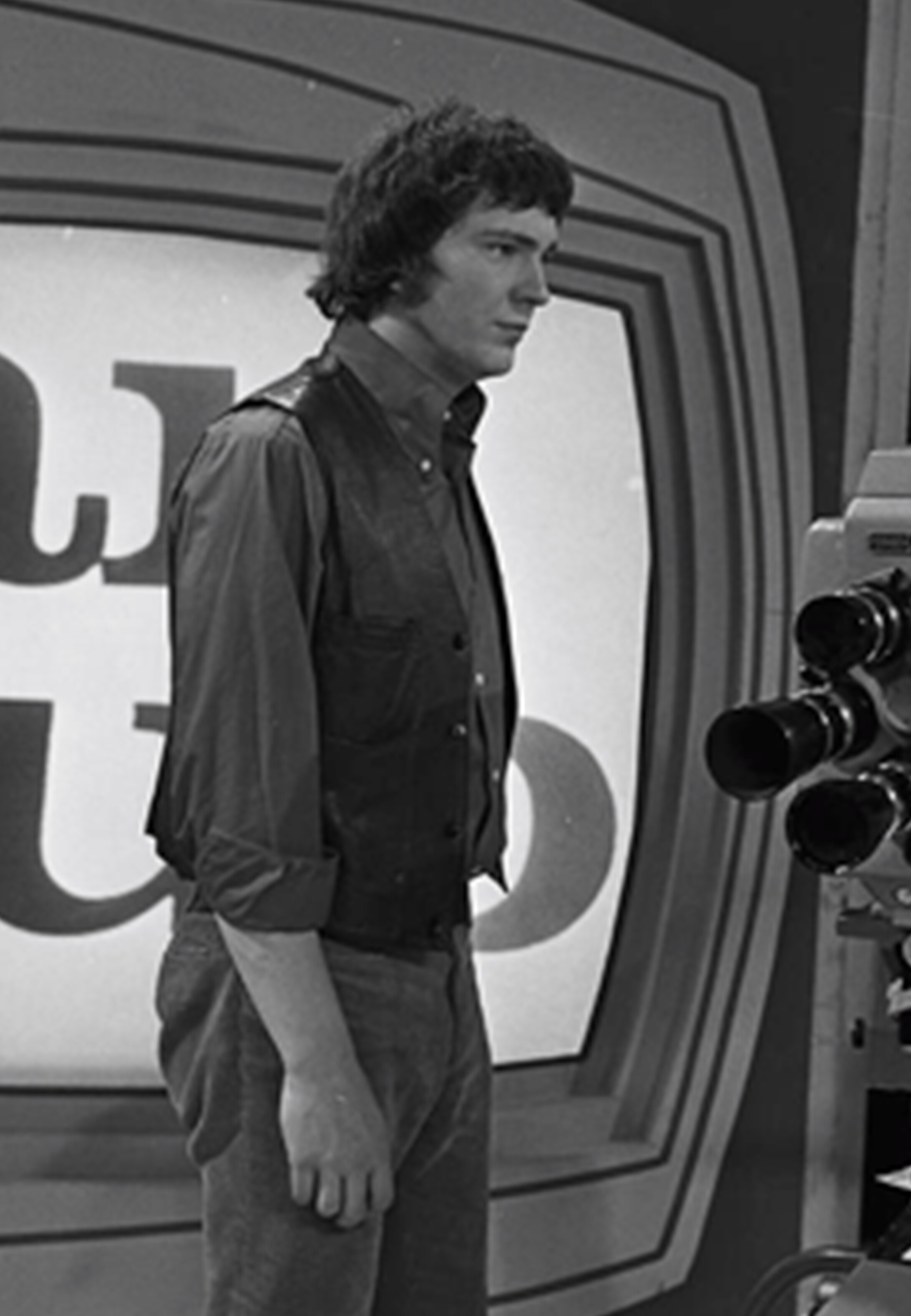
- McCulloch in 1967

Background information
- Born: Daniel Joseph McCulloch; 18 July 1945; Shepherd's Bush, West London, England
- Died: 29 January 2015 (aged 69) Catford, London, England
- Genre: Rock
- Instruments: Bass, vocals, guitar
- Years active: 1960s-2015
- Formerly of: The Animals, Renaissance

Daniel Joseph "Danny" McCulloch (18 July 1945 – 29 January 2015) was an English musician best known as the bassist of the 1960s psychedelic rock group Eric Burdon and The Animals.

== Early life ==
Danny McCulloch was born in Shepherd's Bush, West London, England. Despite a common surname, he was not a relation of either Henry McCullough (who did work under original Animal Chas Chandler's management) or Jimmy McCulloch, both members of the 1970s band Wings.

== Career ==
=== Early career ===
McCulloch commenced performing publicly at the age of eleven, playing skiffle music. His first band was The Avro Boys, from Shepherd's Bush, who became Tony Craven & The Casuals in the late 1950s. In 1960, The Casuals linked up with new singer Frankie Reid and McCulloch remained with the group until October 1962. During his time with Frankie Reid & The Casuals, one of the band's drummers was Mitch Mitchell.

McCulloch and drummer Derek Sirmon next joined Screaming Lord Sutch & The Savages and stayed until May 1963. In 1964, McCullough and Sirmon joined Woking band, The Plebs, who recorded a lone single. During mid-1966, McCulloch worked briefly with The Carl Douglas Set, until he was approached by Eric Burdon to join Burdon's new band.

=== The Animals ===
In late 1966, after the breakup of the original incarnation of The Animals, McCulloch joined the "New Animals", being the first "new" Animal hired by Eric Burdon. McCulloch in turn introduced Burdon to guitarist and violinist John Weider, who in turn introduced Burdon to guitarist Vic Briggs.

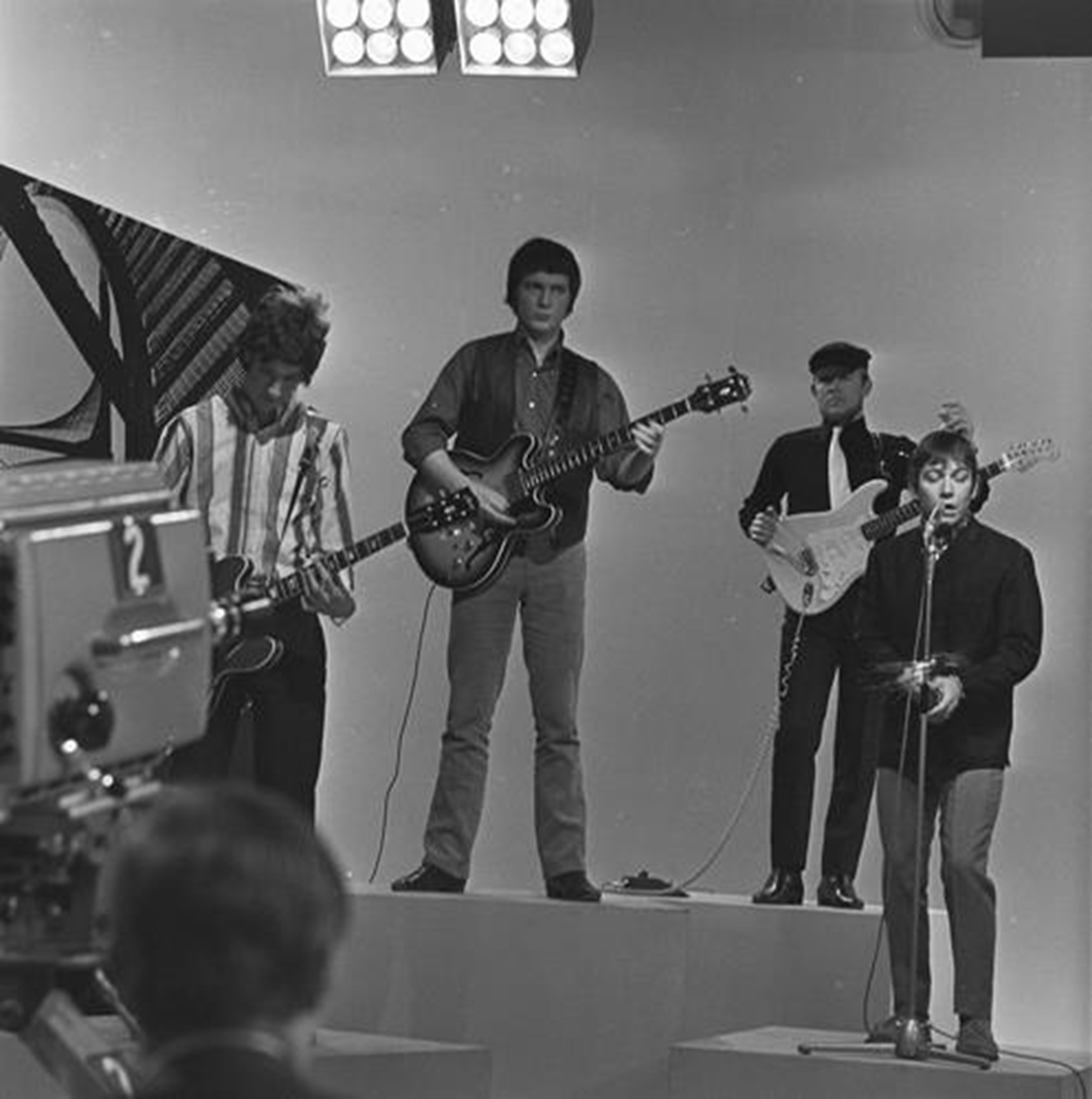
McCulloch (centre) in 1967

The reconstituted group released three albums and a series of hit singles, including "San Franciscan Nights", "Monterey" and "Sky Pilot". All band members were credited as co-authors on the two albums from which these singles were released. It was only as of the third album of the reconstituted group, Every One of Us, that songwriting credit was primarily that of Eric Burdon. Keyboardist Zoot Money also joined the band at that time.

Shortly prior to the release of this third album, McCulloch and Briggs were both fired from the band. McCulloch was replaced by Weider switching from guitar to bass, while Briggs was replaced by Andy Summers, later of The Police.

=== Solo and With Others ===
McCulloch and Briggs worked together thereafter. In 1969, with Briggs acting as producer and arranger, McCulloch released the album Wings of a Man.

In 1971, McCulloch was the bassist on the solo album of Reg King, former lead singer of The Action. Other musicians included Mick Taylor, Steve Winwood and Brian Auger. Also in 1971, he joined Renaissance as a bassist for a short period, playing with former Plebs bandmate Michael Dunford, who was a composer and guitarist with Renaissance.

In the 1980s, McCulloch worked as a psychiatric nurse in Rauceby Hospital, the south Lincolnshire psychiatric hospital located in Sleaford, Lincolnshire.

In 1992, McCulloch joined as the bass player and a vocalist of a reconstituted Animals, including Vic Briggs and drummer Barry Jenkins. At the time, Briggs asserted that he had a right to call the band "The Animals", having trademarked the name in the United States. With Phil Ryan on lead vocals, instead of Eric Burdon, the band played the first rock concert held in Red Square, Moscow, as part of a benefit concert for the victims of the Chernobyl nuclear disaster.

In 1993, following the Red Square performance, McCulloch put together a new Animals group, which rerecorded the old hits of the band, plus others, including originals by McCulloch. The material received mixed reviews, including some involving confusion and inaccurate assumptions that Eric Burdon was singing on the album. Some purchasers, upon discovery that Burdon was not involved, felt that they had been misled.

In 1995, as "Danny McCulloch's Friends", he released a second album, Beowulf. The songs on the album were generally co-written with Steve Rowland, who also produced the album, and also included one co-written with former Fleetwood Mac guitarist Danny Kirwan. The "Friends" included Gary Wright, Chris Spedding, Herbie Flowers, Ray Cooper, Steve Gregory, Chas Hodges and Chris Mercer.

=== Legal issues ===
Between 1996 and 1998, McCulloch was involved in controversy concerning re-recordings alleged to have been made by certain artists, in particular Mott the Hoople, involving an alleged reformation of the band by Ian Hunter and Mick Ronson in 1993. With musician and music promoter Gerry Chapman, McCulloch had formed McCulloch Chapman Music, which marketed to K-Tel International what were represented to be new recordings by original artists, such as Mott The Hoople, "The New Animals", Paper Lace and The Byrds. The recordings represented by McCulloch to be new recordings by Hunter and Ronson were in fact by a sound-alike, asserted to be McCulloch and Chapman, operating under the band name The Trybe. Five of the twelve songs on the alleged Mott The Hoople "greatest hits" recording were credited to McCulloch and Chapman, and had never previously been recorded by Mott The Hoople. K-Tel stated that it had dealt with McCulloch successfully in the past, and had paid $75,000 for the tapes. McCulloch claimed that Ian Hunter's voice had been remixed along with a soundalike voice in order to strengthen it, and that the remixing had been done with Ian Hunter's knowledge and permission. Hunter categorically denied the assertions, stating that he had not recorded with Ronson since 1989.

The K-Tel album, The Best of Mott The Hoople, was accordingly withdrawn in 1997, having been released in 1996. In 1998, further to a complaint by Ian Hunter's management, K-Tel admitted guilt to two charges under the Trade Descriptions Act 1968 and was accordingly fined. The false Mott The Hoople recordings had been licensed to other companies by McCulloch Chapman Music, resulting in multiple releases of the misrepresented content, including All The Young Dudes (Denmark Digimode, 1996; Ireland, Eagle Rock Pegasus, 1997), Dudes (UK Going for a Song, 1997)) and The Magic Collection (Holland ARC MEC, 1997) Some of the false Mott The Hoople releases included historic cover pictures of the band or band members. In 2002, the recordings were again released, under the title I Can't Believe It's Not Mott The Hoople, and credited to The Trybe. These recordings were also subsequently released on ITunes. Similar releases by The Trybe covered Steppenwolf songs, while again including songs by McCulloch and Chapman.

=== Later works ===
In the 2000s, McCulloch was touring with a new Animals formation, called Animals and Friends, led by original drummer John Steel and organist Dave Rowberry, though McCulloch was not a regular member of the group.

In 2012, McCulloch released a digital biography on Amazon Digital Services, When I Was Young, in which he describes joining and playing with The Animals as "the biggest mistake of my life". The book is described as "tell(ing) the truth of the big rip off to musicians in the 60's and 70's". In 2013, McCulloch released the album Back Again, Just for a Bit.

== Death ==
McCulloch died from heart failure on 29 January 2015, aged 69.

== Discography ==
=== Solo ===
==== Albums ====
- 2013 Back Again, Just For A Bit (Anim)
- 1995 Beowolf (Edsel)
- 1969 Wings of A Man (Capitol)

==== Singles ====
- 1969 Wings of A Man/Orange and Red Beams (Capitol)
- 1969 Hope/Hold On (Capitol)
- 1969 Blackbird/Time of Man (Capitol)
- 1970 Colour of the Sunset/Smokeless Zone (Pye)

=== As The Trybe ===
- 2011 The Trybe Perform Mott The Hoople (Excalibur)
- 2010 Magic Carpet Ride (Excalibur)
- 2009 The Trybe Play Mott The Hoople and Others (A.M.I)
- 2009 The Trybe Play Steppenwolf and Others
- 2002 I Can't Believe It's Not Mott The Hoople

=== As The Animals ===
- 1999 The Animals (Hallmark)
- 1997 The Best of The Animals (K-tel)

=== As The Misrepresented Mott The Hoople ===
- 1998 All The Young Dudes
- 1997 The Magic Collection
- 1997 Dudes
- 1997 Mott The Hoople
- 1997 All The Young Dudes
- 1996 All The Young Dudes
- 1996 The Best of Mott The Hoople

=== Eric Burdon and The Animals ===
==== Albums ====
- 1968 Every One of Us
- 1967 The Twain Shall Meet
- 1967 Winds of Change

==== Singles ====
- 1968 White Houses
- 1968 Sky Pilot
- 1967 Monterey
- 1967 Anything
- 1967 Good Times
- 1967 San Franciscan Nights
- 1967 When I Was Young
