= White Houses (Eric Burdon and the Animals song) =

Single by Eric Burdon & the Animals

from the album Every One Of Us
- B-side: "River Deep, Mountain High"
- Released: November 1968
- Genre: Folk rock, psychedelic rock
- Length: 3:45
- Label: MGM Records
- Songwriter(s): Eric Burdon
- Producer(s): Tom Wilson

Eric Burdon & the Animals singles chronology
"Sky Pilot" (1968)	"White Houses" (1968)	"Ring of Fire" (1969)

White Houses is a song by Eric Burdon & the Animals from 1968. It was the opening track from their psychedelic rock album Every One Of Us. "White Houses" peaked #67 on the US pop singles chart and #46 on the Canadian RPM charts. The B-side was "River Deep, Mountain High," later included on their album Love Is. "River Deep, Mountain High" was also viewed as the A-side of the release in some countries.

In 1995, Burdon re-recorded the song. It is featured on Absolutely the Best (1999).

In 2002, Ed Kuepper covered it as part of a medley, which also featured the song "Hey Gyp," another by Eric Burdon.
