= When I Was Young (song) =

- Italy sleeve art

Single by Eric Burdon and the Animals
- B-side: "A Girl Named Sandoz"
- Released: 25 March 1967 (US) 19 May (UK)
- Recorded: December 1966
- Genre: Psychedelic rock, raga rock
- Length: 3:00
- Label: MGM
- Songwriters: Eric Burdon, John Weider, Vic Briggs, Danny McCulloch, Barry Jenkins
- Producer: Tom Wilson

Eric Burdon and the Animals singles chronology
"Help Me Girl" (1966)	"When I Was Young" (1967)	"San Franciscan Nights" (1967)

"When I Was Young" is a song released in March 1967 by Eric Burdon and the Animals; it was written by five of the band members – Eric Burdon (vocals), John Weider (guitar/violin), Vic Briggs (guitar), Danny McCulloch (bass), and Barry Jenkins (drums) – and was the first release to feature this lineup. It charted in Australia, peaking at No. 2 and staying 4 weeks there. Later, it hit No. 10 on the Canadian RPM chart, No. 15 in the United States, and No. 9 in the Netherlands.

== Background and Recording ==
This somewhat autobiographical song tells about Burdon's father, who was a soldier during tough times, as well as young Eric's adventures - including his first cigarette at 10, to his meeting his first love at 13. The final verse shows his disillusionment with society:

"My faith was so much stronger then,
I believed in fellow men,
And I was so much older then.

When I was Young".

This song is noted for its Indian riff, played by an electric guitar and a violin. It is also distinctive for its introduction, which featured a heavily distorted guitar's whammy bar descent from E to D. The song begins in E Minor and ends in G Minor.

The group recorded "When I Was Young" in December 1966 at Barnes studio in London, with Tom Wilson in the producer's seat. It was the first song recorded by the new band although earlier sessions in September 1966 using studio musicians would be released as an album in March 1967 called Eric Is Here and credited to Eric Burdon & The Animals. The B-side "A Girl Named Sandoz" would be recorded in early February 1967 in New York City, and is named after the Swiss drug company that invented and manufactured LSD. "When I Was Young" was first premiered on The Mike Douglas Show on February 21, with the band miming to the song and "See See Rider".

In time, it was utilized in a German TV commercial. In early 1980s live shows Burdon began to mention, at the end of the song, many stars who had died.

== Reception ==
Billboard described the single as containing "blockbuster biting material" and an "intriguing dance arrangement." Cash Box called the single a "strong, gutsy, reflective Blues effort with a particularly interesting instrumental backing."

== Charts ==
Chart (1967)	Peak position
Canada Top Singles (RPM)	10
Netherlands (Single Top 100)	9
New Zealand (Listener)	5
US Billboard Hot 100	15
West Germany (GfK)	31
