= San Franciscan Nights =

Single by Eric Burdon and The Animals

from the album Winds of Change
- B-side: "Good Times" (USA), "Gratefully Dead" (UK)
- Released: August 1967
- Length: 3:20
- Label: MGM
- Songwriters: Burdon, Briggs, Weider, Jenkins, McCulloch
- Producer: Tom Wilson

Eric Burdon and The Animals singles chronology
| "When I Was Young" (1967) | "San Franciscan Nights" (1967) | "Good Times" (1967) |

"San Franciscan Nights" is a 1967 song performed by Eric Burdon and The Animals. Words and music were composed by the group's members, Eric Burdon, Vic Briggs, John Weider, Barry Jenkins, and Danny McCulloch. A paean to San Francisco, it was the biggest hit that the new band – as opposed to the first-incarnation Animals of the mid-1960s – would have. It reached a peak position of number 1 on the Canadian RPM charts, number 9 on the U.S. pop singles chart, and number 7 on the UK pop singles chart.

== Background ==
The band wrote "San Franciscan Nights" themselves as a protest song against the Vietnam War. Looking back on the tune in a 2010 interview with Songfacts, Burdon said: "The 'Love Generation' helped the anti-war stance in the States. It certainly turned a lot of soldiers' heads around, making them wonder why they had to be out fighting a war when back home their girlfriends were frolicking around and it caused a lot of anguish on that level. Maybe it helped politically with the so-called enemy. I'm not sure."

The song opens with a brief parody of the Dragnet theme. This is followed by a spoken word dedication by Burdon "to the city and people of San Francisco, who may not know it but they are beautiful and so is their city", with Burdon urging European residents to "save up all your bread and fly Trans Love Airways to San Francisco, U.S.A.," to enable them to "understand the song", and "for the sake of your own peace of mind".

The melody then begins with lyrics about a warm 1967 San Franciscan night, with hallucinogenic images of a "strobe light's beam" creating dreams, walls and minds moving, angels singing, "jeans of blue," and "Harley Davidsons too," contrasted with a "cop's face is filled with hate" (on a street called "Love") and an appeal to the "old cop" and the "young cop" to just "feel all right". Pulling in as many 1960s themes as possible, the song then concludes with a plea that the American dream include "Indians too".

Billboard described the single as having an "off-beat opener" that "turns into a plaintive, meaningful ballad saluting the hot music city". Cash Box said that it has "pretty guitar work behind the easy-going vocal".

The flipside of the UK version of this single was a song called "Gratefully Dead", another nod from the Animals to the San Francisco scene.

Burdon's notion that San Francisco's nights are warm drew some derision from Americans more familiar with the city's climate – best exemplified by the apocryphal Mark Twain saying, "The coldest winter I ever spent was a summer in San Francisco." – and music writer Lester Bangs thought Burdon's notion "inexplicable". But in fact, Burdon and his group had recently played in San Francisco during a rare 10-day stretch of exceptionally warm spring weather, which left a strong, if erroneous impression on them. Burdon also offered other interpretations. In late 1967, he told a reporter about the favorable impression the city had left on him when he first visited. "The reason I wrote 'San Franciscan Nights' is that I went to San Francisco and had a groovy time there." And after performing the song in concert in 1983, he "rolled his eyes at the end and said, 'It's got nothing to do with the weather.'" Years later, in 2017, he reiterated to an interviewer his fondness for the city, saying that San Francisco would always "hold a special place in my heart." He also observed, with some amusement, that when the Animals played at Stern Grove recently, the weather was neither foggy nor chilly, and it was "the best day of the year."

At a concert in Naperville, Illinois in 2010, Burdon said the song was written about an evening with Janis Joplin in San Francisco.

== Charts ==
| Chart (1967) | Peak position |
|---|---|
| Belgium (Ultratop 50 Wallonia) | 18 |
| Canada Top Singles (RPM) | 1 |
| Finland (Soumen Virallinen) | 29 |
| Ireland (IRMA) | 16 |
| Netherlands (Single Top 100) | 5 |
| New Zealand (Listener Chart) | 7 |
| UK Singles (Official Charts) | 7 |
| US Billboard Hot 100 | 9 |
| West Germany (GfK) | 20 |
