= Good Times (Eric Burdon and the Animals song) =

Single by Eric Burdon & the Animals

from the album Winds of Change
- B-side: "Ain't That So"
- Released: September 1967
- Recorded: March 1967
- Length: 2:58
- Label: MGM Records 1344
- Songwriter(s): Burdon, Briggs, Weider, Jenkins, McCulloch
- Producer(s): Tom Wilson

Eric Burdon & the Animals singles chronology
"San Franciscan Nights" (1967)	"Good Times" (1967)	"Anything" (1967)

"Good Times" is a song recorded by Eric Burdon & the Animals and released on the 1967 album Winds of Change, with music and lyrics by Eric Burdon, John Weider, Vic Briggs, Danny McCulloch and Barry Jenkins.

The single reached number 20 on the UK Singles Chart. It was the B-side to "San Franciscan Nights" in the U.S. The B-side "Ain't that So" was included as part of the soundtrack to the film Stranger in the House (1967). Every band member, except Burdon, appeared at the premiere.

In 1987, it was released as a single again, while it was the soundtrack to the movie Die Katze starring Götz George. This version reached #53 in Germany.

The song was covered by Ozzy Osbourne in 2005.

== Charts ==
Chart (1967–1988)	Peak position
UK Singles (OCC)	20
West Germany (GfK)	53
