= Phil Ryan (entrepreneur) =

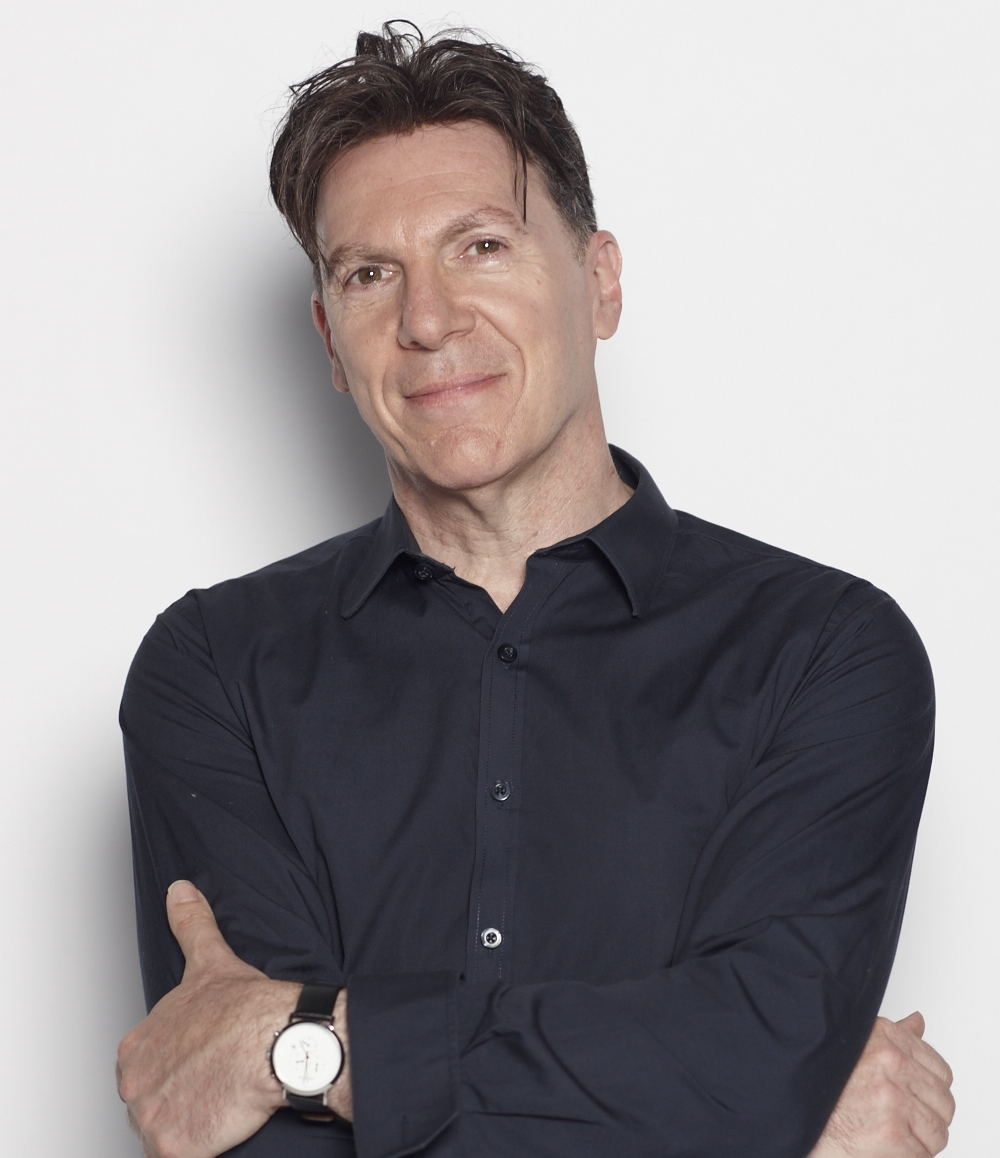
Phil Ryan

Phil Ryan is an English musician, writer and entrepreneur. He has toured with The Animals and is co-founder of The Big Issue and The 12 Bar Club.

== Music ==
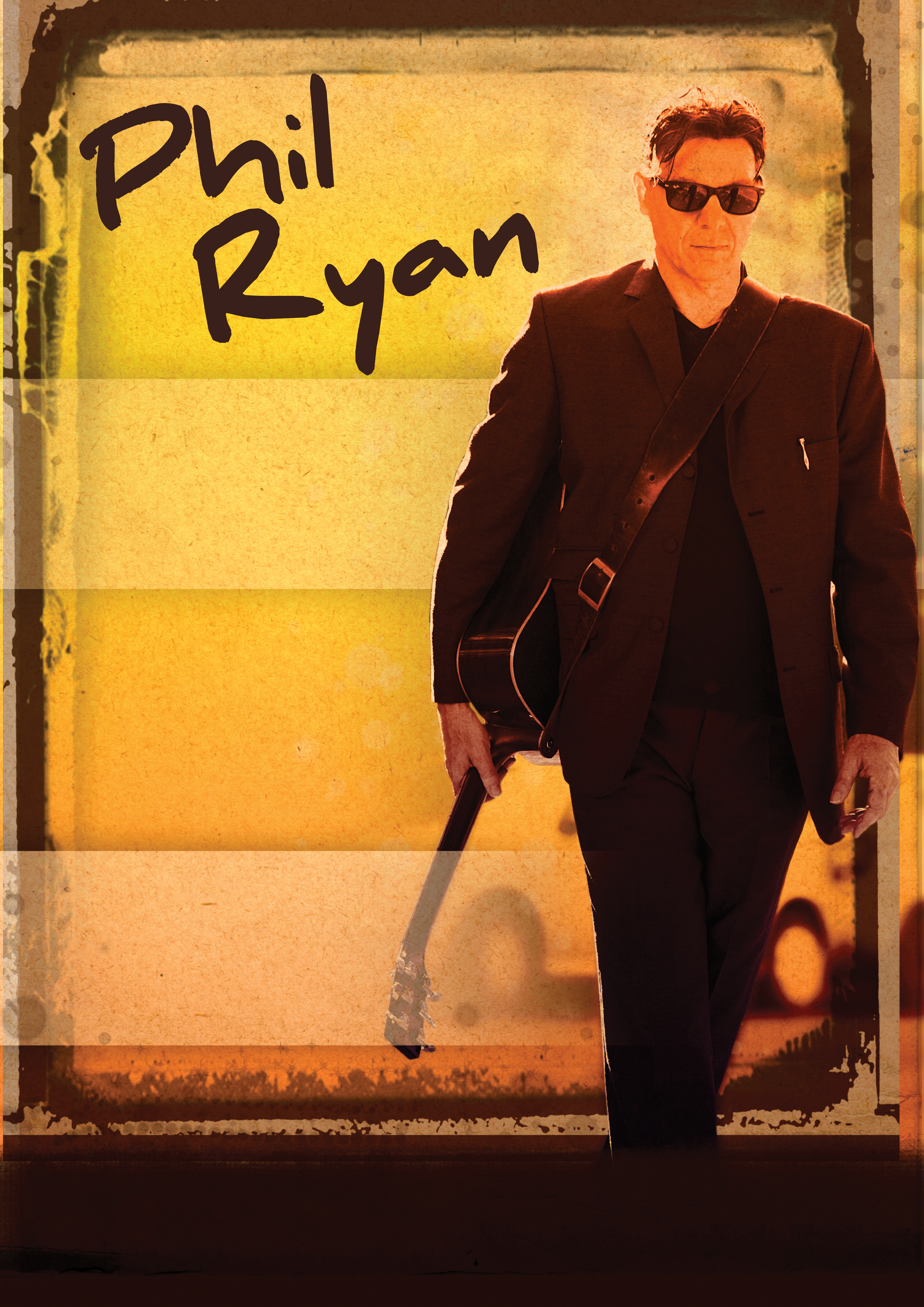
Phil Ryan on a poster from 2018

Ryan started his musical career as a session guitarist, recording with various well known artists and headlining at festivals all across England throughout the 1980s. The early 1990s saw him touring Europe and the United States, with performances in Stockholm, San Francisco, Los Angeles, New York, Barcelona, Munich, Nuremberg and Berlin, among others. In 1992, Ryan joined The Animals as lead singer and performed with them at the 'Children of Chernobyl' benefit concert in Moscow's Red Square in front of an audience of 100,000. In 2001, he recorded his first solo album, Storm Warning, and toured European festivals, such as the Bardentreffen in Nuremberg, Germany, with it. He contributed the charity single "Thanks for loving me" to the Jack Brown Appeal. Ryan was a featured artist at Rooftop Records where he mentored aspiring musicians. From 2015 he was involved in the Save TPA Campaign group trying to protect the historic Musical and historical heritage soaked Denmark Street in London's West End street from complete destruction and re-development into Luxury Flats and shops. Phil was part of the team that made the documentary film 'Tin Pan Alley Tales' capturing the history of Denmark Street (the developers won the battle and now much of the street and surrounding area has inevitably been re-developed as luxury apartments including a luxury hotel and shopping area) The Documentary features the stories of the people who made the street and area the leading and world music business influencing place it once was. In 2017 the film started production after a successful crowdfunding campaign and was later released in late 2018. The Director was Henry Scott-Irvine, Phil was an Executive Producer. In 2017 Phil also worked with German Film Composer Jan Willem De With (Hamburg/Zurich) to orchestrate his song 'As we grow Old', which was released in mid 2018 to support his European tour festival dates. On 1 December 2017 he released the song 'Walking Down This Lonely Street' in co-operation with The Big Issue to raise funds for Homeless People over the Christmas period and beyond. The track is still available via AWAL on major download platforms.

He also recorded and filmed a new collection of songs across 2018/19. Some of which regularly feature in his current live special guest performances. His website allows access to his current musical projects.

In late 2018, Ryan was featured on the Your London Legacy Podcast - he was chosen to be an interviewee as an Inspirational Londoner. He talked about his life and journey so far. There are two podcasts available to listen to.

In late 2019 Ryan shot a promotional video for the new remix of his song 'As we grow Old' (available on YouTube) The song has its own stand-alone website where a free download (released in February 2020) can still be sent to the person of anyone's choice. At the time of this entry the track has been streamed 605,621 times on Spotify.

In 2020 the Covid-19 Epidemic forced him to pause his career and cancel his session work and live shows in Europe. From late 2023 there are plans underway to launch a series of intimate shows and performances called ‘An Evening with Phil Ryan’ across the UK and in 2024 in selected European locations.

In April 2023 he launched his Lucky Seven online TV channel on YouTube, featuring a vast body of his music work, including studio performances, location performances, live performances and even tutorials on the art of song writing. He hopes to return to live concerts in Europe in mid 2026 with a new song collection. Linked to his passion for music was his 2023/4 joint weekly column with Culture Editor Laura Kelly at The Big Issue as part of their Venue Watch Campaign to save the UK's Grassroots Music venues (in partnership with The Music Venues Trust) Currently in 2025 he has just signed with Phoenix Music International to represent his publishing and promote his works for syncs in TV and Film. His new album Lucky Seven is set for release on December the 12th 2025. He is appearing at the Theatro Technis in July 2026 as part of their Cyprus Week celebration and he is giving a special concert for the Anterros Foundation in Norwich on September the 20th plus there are now plans for him to be a special guest at the Luneberg Sounds of Cinema Christmas Concert in Germany in December 2026.

== Business ==
Ryan was a co-founder of The Big Issue, a magazine written by professional journalists and sold by homeless people. Originally meeting John Bird to start a literary magazine. Ryan assisted Bird as his number two in setting up and creating and launching and running the original concept for The Big Issue. The funding for the project came from businessman and Body Shop Chairman Gordon Roddick. Ryan and Bird in the first year sharing an office on Richmond Green and putting a full team together. Ryan negotiated with the Metropolitan Police regarding vendors being allowed to sell on the streets. Going on to write the vendors’ operating rules still used today. Also he toured hostels and centres recruiting the first Big Issue vendors Swithinbank sadly erroneously reporting that Ryan was merely taken on in the early stages of the magazine's creation by John Bird, who founded the project with Gordon Roddick. In September 1994 Ryan started the 12 Bar Club with Lars Ericson. The music venue was located in central London and featured performances by artists such as Nick Harper and Boo Hewerdine as part of Ryan's music policy. The 12 Bar Club was awarded Live music Venue of the Year '95/'96 by Time Out magazine. Ryan also ran Storm Books, an online publishing platform set up in 2010 that was designed to make the work of up and coming writers available to a wider audience.

In 2015 Phil became a BBC Radio London 'Listed Londoner' on the award-winning Robert Elms show. He talked about the city, his favourite things to do and what London means to him and his career.

In 2016 The Big Issue magazine ran its 25th-anniversary edition featuring an original picture of John Bird and Phil Ryan in their original office in Richmond, London. The article featured information on Phil's pivotal role in the early days of the magazines set up. In the same month Phil launched a new fundraising song for the Big Issue initiative at the Proud Gallery Camden Wednesday 19 October 2016. The song was released in late 2017.

In 2017 he launched a podcast of his written works in audio format on AudioBoom under his Storm Productions company name. In the same year, he was also featured in a book of influential Londoners 'For the Love of London' by Conrad Gamble - published by Octopus Books via Hachette (publisher).

July 2018 saw the UK premiere of the Film Documentary 'Tin Pan Alley Tales' which Phil was Executive Producer for and also appears in. The Documentary garnered various industry awards.

In 2018/19 he helped create and launch a new literary and literacy magazine 'The Chapter Catcher'. It was a quarterly magazine available by subscription.

Through the Covid-19 lockdowns of 2020/21 he set up his latest publishing projects. He created a book trilogy ‘The Covid Diaries of Phil Ryan’, currently under consideration for release in late 2024.

His latest creative business project The Story Hive launched on February 10, 2023, it is an online audio story website. Available completely free to users, it features streamable audio versions of all of his novels and short story collections. The first 'Story Hive Live performance event' took place in January 2025 - see Stage section) In late 2025 he became a Brand Ambassador for the bespoke perfume brand Tallulah O'Hara, after they created his own private scent! Recently appearing at The Mall Gallery International artisan perfumiers brand event to promote the brand to a wider audience. In 2026 on April 26th the BBC Radio 4 programme Reunion, hosted by Kirsty Wark gathered some of the original Big Issue founding team to look back. Where Phil and some of his old colleagues discussed the first year in the creation of The Big Issue. The programme is available on BBC iplayer.

== Stage ==
Ryan also turned his hand to theatre: his first stage play, The Blessed was performed at Theatro Technis, Camden, London in 1989. His musical adaptation of George Eliot's novel Silas Marner premiered in London in 2000, also at the Theatro Technis. The Arts Theatre was the venue for The Phil Ryan Show, a show that featured selected acoustic musicians and singer songwriters including Peter Conway, Art Fazil, Evi Vine, Baby Sol, Dean Dyson and Chris Newland, which Ryan launched in 2007. In the following year Ryan wrote a song for And Then They Came for Me, an award-winning play which charts the lives of two of Anne Frank's friends who survived the Holocaust. Ryan himself featured in John Bird's two-man show The Naked Bird, a critically acclaimed piece that was performed at the Edinburgh Festival Fringe in 2008 and at the Theatro Technis in London in May 2013. The BODS Theatre Company in Reigate mounted a full production of the Musical Silas Marner in November 2016 (to critical acclaim on the NODA Website).

In 2019 Ryan completed a full set of master recordings featuring a full cast for a major new production of 'Silas Marner'. The musicals plot and key songs can be found on its page on . Sadly because of the Covid-19 crisis the show's original funding was lost, unavoidably delaying its release until mid 2027. It will very likely then make its premiere performances in Europe around that time. As part of his Story Hive Audio Stories platform he launched its new Live stage version as 'The Story Hive Live an evening of stories and songs' with Phil Ryan, Lord John Bird (Big Issue Founder) and Edinburgh Fringe star Marisya Tremblecka (The Singing Psychic) in late January 2025 at The Farsight Gallery 4 Flitcroft Street, London WC2H 8DJ. The second Story Hive Live show then took place at The Questors Theatre in Ealing London on May the 17th. Currently plans are underway for him to appear with his new stage show 'Why I never met Bruce Springsteen' in Canada at two Theatre Festivals in mid 2026. Currently he is finishing his next stage musical THe Last Note.
