= Eric Is Here =

Studio album by Eric Burdon & the Animals
- Released: March 1967
- Recorded: 16 September 1966
- Genre: Pop
- Length: 31:18
- Label: MGM E-4433
- Producer: Tom Wilson

Eric Burdon & the Animals chronology
Eric Is Here (1967)	Winds of Change (1967)

Singles from Eric Is Here
- 1. "Help Me Girl" b/w "That Ain't Where It's At" Released: December 1966 MGM 13636 (USA)

Professional ratings
Review scores
Source	Rating
AllMusic	2/5 stars
Encyclopedia of Popular Music	3/5 stars

Eric Is Here is a 1967 album billed to Eric Burdon & the Animals, although the actual bands with Burdon are the Benny Golson orchestra and the Horace Ott Orchestra.

== History ==
The album was released in the United States only, by MGM Records, during the gap between the time that the original incarnation of the Animals broke up, and the new incarnation, billed as Eric Burdon & the Animals, was being formed. The "new" Animals were formed in November 1966, though MGM chose to focus on Eric Is Here during the initial period of the band's formation and performing career, releasing "Help Me Girl" as a single in December 1966, and the album Eric Is Here in March 1967.

Eric Is Here featured Burdon and drummer Barry Jenkins recording the works of various pop songwriters, accompanied by the orchestras of Benny Golson and Horace Ott, with arrangements by Ott and Golson. Ott had co-written "Don't Let Me Be Misunderstood", which had been a 1965 hit for the Animals. Golson had previously co-led, with Art Farmer, the Jazztet. At the time of recording the album, Golson had given up jazz and was concentrating on orchestral work, as well as contributing to the music of various television series.

It is possible that some members of the first incarnation Animals were present during the sessions, or that the record included material previously recorded by the group.

== Song backgrounds ==
"Help Me Girl" reached No. 29 in the US and No. 14 on Decca F12502 in the UK. the Outsiders also had a version of the song, which hit No. 37 in the UK.

"It's Not Easy" was also a No. 95 hit for the pop group the Will O Bees. It was composed by Barry Mann and Cynthia Weil, who co-authored the Animals' earlier hit "We Gotta Get Out of This Place."

"The Biggest Bundle of Them All" was featured on the soundtrack for the film The Biggest Bundle of Them All, with an alternate version of the song in the film.

"This Side of Goodbye" is the Gerry Goffin and Carole King composition "On This Side of Goodbye", originally recorded by the Righteous Brothers (1966).

== Track listing ==
=== Side one ===
1. "In the Night" (Tommy Boyce, Bobby Hart) 2:28
2. "Mama Told Me Not to Come" (Randy Newman) 2:15
3. "I Think It's Gonna Rain Today" (Randy Newman) 2:01
4. "This Side of Goodbye" (Gerry Goffin, Carole King) 3:24
5. "That Ain't Where It's At" (Martin Siegel) 2:58
6. "True Love (Comes Only Once in a Lifetime)" (Bob Haley, Nevel Nader) 2:33

=== Side two ===
1. "Help Me Girl" (Scott English, Larry Weiss) 2:39
2. "Wait Till Next Year" (Randy Newman) 2:15
3. "Losin' Control" (Carl D'Errico, Roger Atkins)
4. "It's Not Easy" (Barry Mann, Cynthia Weil) 3:07
5. "The Biggest Bundle of Them All" (Ritchie Cordell, Sal Trimachi) 2:11
6. "It's Been a Long Time Comin'" (Jimmy Radcliffe, Joey Brooks) 2:42

Tracks 1, 2, 5, 7 and 10–12 arranged and conducted by Horace Ott

Tracks 3, 4, 6, 8 and 9 arranged and conducted by Benny Golson

== Personnel ==
- Eric Burdon – vocals
- Barry Jenkins – drums
- The Horace Ott and Benny Golson Orchestras

=== Other personnel ===
- Val Valentin – direction
- Benny Golson – arranger, conductor
- Horace Ott – arranger, conductor
- Nancy Reiner – cover art
- Acy Lehman – cover design
- Bill McMeehan – recording engineer
- Gene Radice – sound mixer

== Charts ==
Chart (1967)	Peak position
US Billboard Top LPs	121
