= Barry Jenkins (musician) =

English musician (1944–2024)

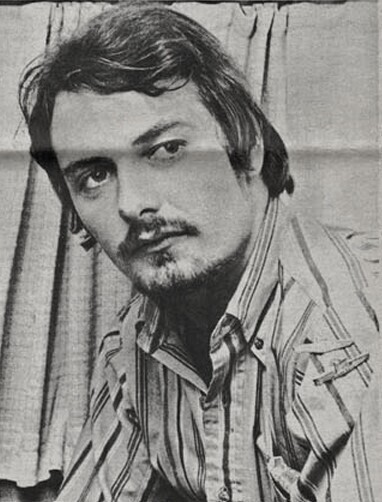
- Jenkins in mid-1966

Background information
- Born: 22 December 1944; Leicester, England
- Died: 27 January 2024 (aged 79) Ramsgate, Kent, England
- Genres: Rock and roll, R&B
- Instruments: Drums

Colin Ernest "Barry" Jenkins (22 December 1944 – 27 January 2024) was an English musician, best known for being a drummer for the Animals during both of that 1960s group's incarnations.

== History ==
=== Early history – Nashville Teens ===
Barry Jenkins replaced Roger Groome as the drummer for the British R&B based group The Nashville Teens in 1963. In 1964 the group had its first big hit record with "Tobacco Road". Jenkins also was present on their other top ten hit "Google Eye", as well as their lesser hits "The Little Bird", "The Hard Way", and "Find My Way Back Home". The group was Jerry Lee Lewis' backing band on his highly acclaimed album Live at the Star Club, Hamburg.

=== With The Animals ===
In March 1966, original Animals drummer John Steel left the band, after the release of their hit single "Inside-Looking Out". At the time, the band was refusing to re-sign with their then recording manager, Mickie Most, whom they had fired in 1965. Steel left the band due to exhaustion. Eric Burdon had learned of and was impressed with Jenkins and his work with The Nashville Teens. Upon Steel's departure from The Animals, Jenkins was immediately hired by Burdon and the band's new management, without an audition, to the consternation of bassist Chas Chandler. Jenkins joined the band for the albums Animalization and Animalism, released in July and November 1966, respectively. On Animalization, Jenkins plays on four tracks, including the hit singles "Don't Bring Me Down" and "See See Rider". Jenkins is featured in the group photo on the front cover of the album, while departed drummer John Steel is seen on the back cover.

=== With Eric Burdon and The Animals ===
The first incarnation of The Animals was dissolved in September 1966. Animals lead singer Burdon then formed "Eric Burdon & The (New) Animals", with Jenkins as the only band member, other than Burdon, from the previous line-up. Along with studio musicians, the two recorded the album, Eric Is Here, recorded in late 1966 and released in March 1967. The album featured "Help Me Girl", released as a successful single in both the UK and the US. In mid October 1966, Burdon formed a complete group under the name Eric Burdon and The Animals, continuing with Jenkins as drummer. The band became associated with psychedelic rock. Between March 1967 and December 1968, the band released a series of albums and hit singles, the latter including "When I Was Young", "San Franciscan Nights", "Monterey", "Good Times" and "Sky Pilot". On all of these songs, Jenkins was credited with co-authorship, along with the other band members. Other singles on which he performed included "White Houses" and "Ring of Fire". This second incarnation of The Animals disbanded as of December 1968. At the time, the band was based in California. Jenkins was the only band member to immediately return to England after the breakup.

=== Following the breakup of Eric Burdon and The Animals ===
Following the breakup of Eric Burdon and The Animals, Jenkins substantially withdrew from recording and performing. In 1969, he joined the band Heavy Jelly, which included Jackie Lomax on vocals, the first recordings of which included participation from Jim Capaldi and Chris Wood, then of Traffic. Jenkins is credited with playing piano, along with Brian Auger on keyboards on Workers Playtime, the 1971 sole album release by the band B.B. Blunder, an offshoot of the band Blossom Toes, and which included Julie Driscoll on vocals. In 1975, he contributed drums to selections on A Letter Home, an album that included performances by former bandmate Hilton Valentine. In 1978, Jenkins was the last drummer with the touring British rock and roll band, Little Tina & Flight 56, following which he was the first drummer with local Kent band Smalltalk, which also included Flight 56's Nick Barnes on bass and lead vocal, and eventually Jerry Kelk on guitar. In 1992, he joined a reconstituted version of the Animals, including "New Animals" members Vic Briggs and Danny McCulloch. The band played the first rock concert held in Red Square, Moscow, as part of a benefit concert for the victims of the Chernobyl nuclear disaster.

For many years, Jenkins' principal occupation had been as the owner of Lukes Guitars, a guitar shop in Ramsgate, England, selling new and used musical instruments.

== Death ==
Jenkins died in Ramsgate, Kent on 27 January 2024, at the age of 79. His funeral was held on 19 February.
