= John Weider =

British musician (1947–2025)

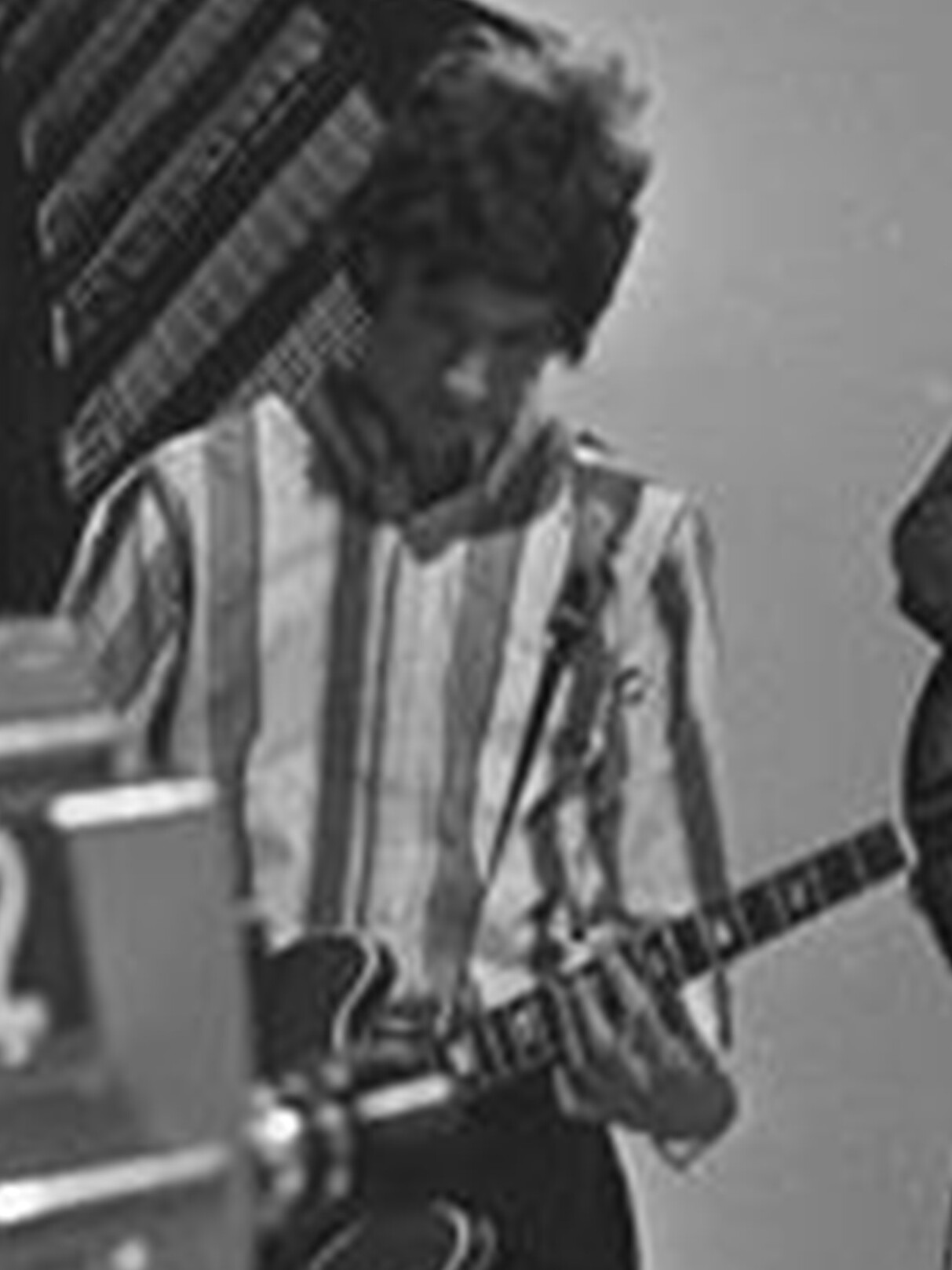
- Weider with Animals and Friends in 1967

Background information
- Born: 21 April 1947; Shepherd's Bush, London, England
- Died: March 2025 (aged 77) Los Angeles, California, U.S.
- Genres: Rock; new-age music
- Occupation: Musician
- Instruments: Guitar; bass; violin
- Years active: 1965–1990
- Labels: Anchor; Gold Castle

John Weider (21 April 1947 – March 2025) was an English rock musician who played guitar, bass guitar and violin. He is best remembered as the guitarist for the Animals from 1966 to 1968. He was also the bass player for Family from 1969 to 1971.

== Life and career ==
=== Early career ===
As a teenager, Weider initially joined the Steve Laine Combo. The Combo played R&B at places such as The Flamingo Club in Soho with the likes of Georgie Fame. Weider left Steve Laine when that group went to Europe to become the Liverpool Five. Later he played alongside Steve Marriott in a band called Steve Marriott and the Moments. He then went on to replace Mick Green as lead guitarist in Johnny Kidd & the Pirates.

In August 1965 Weider was the first in a succession of guitar players replacing Eric Clapton in John Mayall & the Bluesbreakers. This was followed by a stint in Jimmy Winston and His Reflections, with whom he recorded two singles.

=== Eric Burdon and the Animals ===
In 1966, Eric Burdon, frontman for the Animals, put together a new Animals lineup when the original group, with the exception of drummer Barry Jenkins, ceased working with Burdon. The new group, variously called "Eric Burdon and the New Animals" or "Eric Burdon and the Animals", included Weider on guitar and violin. The first album by the new ensemble was the 1967 effort Winds of Change, in which the Animals abandoned their old blues sound and went psychedelic. Weider stayed with the group until its dissolution in December 1968, after releasing three albums that year The Twain Shall Meet, Every One of Us, and Love Is, the latter being a soul-based psychedelic rock album. After bassist Danny McCulloch and guitarist Vic Briggs were fired from the band in mid-1968, Weider and new guitarist Andy Summers (later of the Police) alternated between guitar and bass during the band's concerts.

=== Family ===
By 1969, Weider was in California playing in a group called Stonehenge, members of whom would later form Crabby Appleton, when Ric Grech abruptly left Family to join Eric Clapton, Steve Winwood and Ginger Baker in the new 'supergroup' Blind Faith during Family's first U.S. tour and the band needed a new bassist immediately. Weider thus replaced Grech in Family. Like Grech, he was both a bassist and a violinist, and many of Family's songs had incorporated violin in their arrangements. Weider joined midway through the tour, which ended prematurely owing to lead singer Roger Chapman's visa problems, and a fight with rock promoter/venue owner Bill Graham, which made return visits to the U.S. difficult.

The single "No Mule's Fool", Family's first single with Weider as a band member, took the band in a country rock direction. Weider appears on Family's two 1970 albums, A Song for Me and Anyway released ten months apart. He left the band in the summer of 1971.

=== Later career ===
Weider later joined Stud, a group that featured guitarist-bassist Jim Cregan, who would become Family's final bass player in 1972. The band also included the rhythm section of John Wilson and Richard McCracken from Taste, Rory Gallagher's pre-solo power trio. Weider served as a multi-instrumentalist in Stud, playing guitar, bass, piano, violin and cello. After Stud broke up, Weider did some session work and released his self-titled debut solo album in 1976. In the mid 1970s, he was also a member of the band Moonrider with Keith West. Weider played violin and sang backing vocals on "Nightmare (Please Wake Me Up)", the closing track from the Who's John Entwistle's second solo album, Whistle Rymes (1972). He played guitar on the Alice Cooper track "I'm Flash", which also featured Entwistle, on the album Flash Fearless Vs. the Zorg Women, Pts. 5 & 6 (1975), and later Cooper's 4-CD box set The Life and Crimes of Alice Cooper (1999).

In 1979, he was featured on Gulliver's album Ridin' the Wind.

Weider's more recent albums have been more closely associated with new-age music.

== Death ==
Weider died in Los Angeles, California in March 2025, at the age of 77.

== Solo discography ==
- John Weider (1976)
- Intervals in Sunlight (1987)
- Essence (1989)
- Ancients Weep (1990)
