= The Animals discography =

Cataloguing of published recordings by the Animals

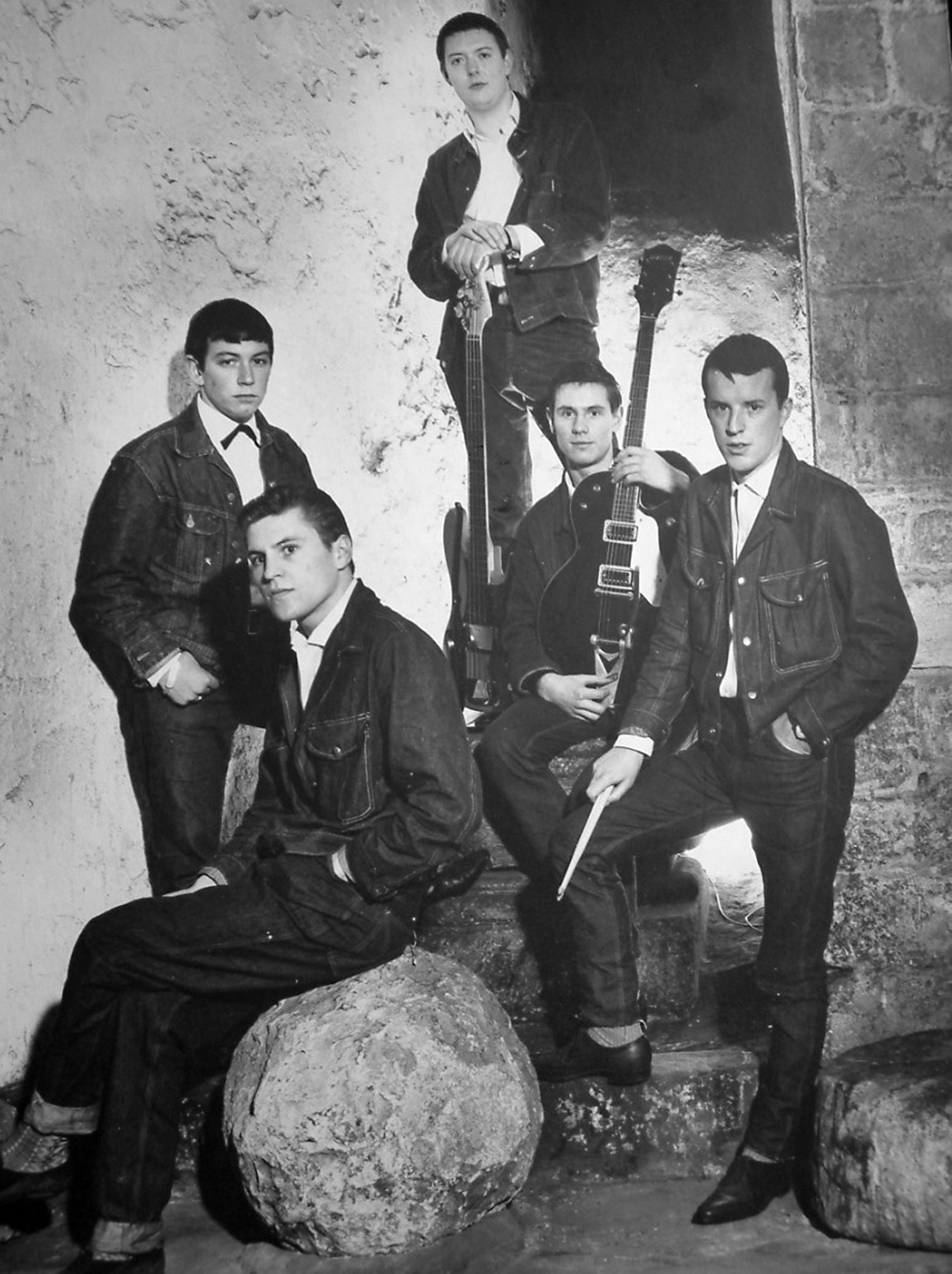
- Posing for publicity in 1964: L–R Eric Burdon (Vocals), Alan Price (Keyboards), Chas Chandler (Bass), Hilton Valentine (Guitar), John Steel (Drums).
- Extended plays: 5
- Live albums: 1
- Compilation albums: 4
- Singles: 25
- Studio albums (US): 5
- Studio albums (UK): 3
- Other studio albums: 5

The discography of the Animals, an English music group of the 1960s formed in Newcastle upon Tyne, contains 20 studio albums, six compilation albums, five EPs and 25 singles. Featuring a gritty, bluesy sound and a deep-voiced frontman in Eric Burdon, they are best known for their rendition of an American folk song "The House of the Rising Sun", which is described by many as their signature song. This single had worldwide sales of nearly 5 million and became a Number One hit in both the UK and US in 1964. Overall, the group balanced tough, rock-edged pop singles such as "We Gotta Get Out of This Place" and "It's My Life" against rhythm and blues–oriented album material. The Animals released separate UK and US albums, a practice common to other British Invasion bands of the time such as the Beatles and the Rolling Stones.

The Animals underwent numerous personnel changes in the mid-1960s and suffered from poor business management. An incarnation using the name "Eric Burdon and the Animals" moved to California in 1967 and achieved commercial success as a psychedelic outfit, before disbanding at the end of the decade. Altogether, the group had ten Top Twenty hits on both the UK charts and US charts.

The original lineup had a brief comeback in 1977 and 1983. There have been several partial regroupings of the original era members since then under various names. The Animals were inducted into the Rock and Roll Hall of Fame in 1994.

== Studio albums ==
The Animals' studio album releases varied significantly between the UK and the US; even those with the same or similar names had different contents.

=== UK albums ===
| Title | Album details | Peak chart positions |
| Title | Album details | UK |
|---|---|---|
| The Animals | Released: 30 October 1964; Label: Columbia (SX 1669); Format: LP | 6 |
| Animal Tracks | Released: 7 May 1965; Label: Columbia (SX 1708); Format: LP | 6 |
| Animalisms | Released: 13 May 1966; Label: Decca (LK 4797); Format: LP | 4 |

=== US albums ===
| Title | Album details | Peak chart positions | | |
| Title | Album details | US | US Cash. | US RW |
|---|---|---|---|---|
| The Animals | Released: September 1964; Label: MGM (E/SE-4264); Format: mono/rechanneled stereo LP | 7 | 14 | 8 |
| The Animals on Tour | Released: February 1965; Label: MGM (E/SE-4281); Format: mono/rechanneled stereo LP | 99 | — | 92 |
| Animal Tracks | Released: September 1965; Label: MGM (E/SE-4305); Format: mono/rechanneled stereo LP | 57 | 27 | 27 |
| Animalization | Released: August 1966; Label: MGM (E/SE-4384); Format: mono/rechanneled stereo LP with 1 true stereo track | 20 | 17 | 13 |
| Animalism | Released: 21 November 1966; Label: MGM (E/SE-4414); Format: mono/stereo LP | 33 | 27 | 21 |
"—" denotes a release that did not chart.

=== Eric Burdon & the Animals albums ===
| Title | Album details | Peak chart positions | | | |
| Title | Album details | UK | US | US Cash. | US RW |
|---|---|---|---|---|---|
| Eric Is Here | Released: March 1967 (US only); Label: MGM (E/SE-4433); Format: mono/stereo LP | — | 121 | 84 | 54 |
| Winds of Change | Released: September 1967; Label: MGM (E/SE-4484); Format: mono/stereo LP | — | 42 | 26 | 23 |
| The Twain Shall Meet | Released: April 1968; Label: MGM (E/SE-4537); Format: mono/stereo LP | — | 79 | 84 | 48 |
| Every One of Us | Released: August 1968 (US only); Label: MGM (SE-4553); Format: stereo LP | — | 152 | — | 107 |
| Love Is | Released: December 1968; Label: MGM (SE-4591-2); Format: stereo LP | — | 123 | 94 | 96 |
"—" denotes a release that did not chart.

=== Reunion albums ===
| Title | Album details | Peak chart positions | | | |
| Title | Album details | UK | US | CAN | NZL |
|---|---|---|---|---|---|
| Before We Were So Rudely Interrupted (released as The Original Animals) | Released: August 1977; Label: Jet; Format: LP | — | 70 | 84 | 24 |
| Ark | Released: August 1983; Label: I.R.S.; Format: LP | — | 66 | — | — |

== Live albums ==
| Title | Album details | Peak chart positions | |
| Title | Album details | UK | US |
|---|---|---|---|
| Greatest Hits Live (Rip It to Shreds) | Released: 1984; Label: I.R.S.; Format: LP | — | — |

== Compilation albums ==
| Title | Album details | Peak chart positions | | | | Certifications |
| Title | Album details | UK | US | US Cash. | US RW | Certifications |
The Animals
| The Best of The Animals | Released: February 1966; Label: MGM (E/SE-4324); Format: Mono/Stereo LP | — | 6 | 5 | 4 | RIAA: Gold |
| The Most of the Animals | Released: February 1966; Label: Columbia (SX-6035); Format: Mono/Stereo LP | 4 | — | — | — | |
Eric Burdon & the Animals
| The Best of Eric Burdon and the Animals Vol. II | Released: June 1967; Label: MGM (E/SE-4454); Format: Mono/Stereo LP | — | 71 | 54 | 48 | |
| The Greatest Hits of Eric Burdon and the Animals | Released: March 1969; Label: MGM (SE-4602); Format: Stereo LP | — | — | — | — | |

=== Off-sequence albums ===
These albums are principally a continuing re-release of a set of live recordings from Club A Go-Go, Newcastle, 1963, either solely The Animals or The Animals and Sonny Boy Williamson II. The track listing for the all-Animals set is generally all of or a selection from "Let It Rock", "Gotta Find My Baby", "Bo Diddley", "Almost Grown", "Dimples", "Boom Boom" and "C Jam Blues". The recordings were made in December, 1963 by Giorgio Gomelsky and involved seven live tracks of the Animals alone and eleven tracks with the Animals backing Sonny Boy Williamson.

- The Animals (Capitol [Canada] T-6092, Sep 1964)
- Mickie Most Presents 'British Go Go' (MGM SE-4306, Jan 1965)
- Wild Animals (Decca, 1966)
- In the Beginning (Wand, 1970) - Live album, recorded 30 December 1963
- Rock Generation Vol. 2 (BYG 529.702, 1973) - The Animals at the Club A Go-Go, Newcastle, 1963
- Rock Generation Vol. 4 (BYG 529.704, 1973) - more of the same, backing Sonny Boy Williamson
- Night Time Is the Right Time (Springboard 4065, 197?) - with Sonny Boy Williamson
- Live (Woodford, 1991)^{A}
- In the Beginning: Live in 1963 (Sundazed, 1993)^{B}
- Almost Grown (Pazzazz, 2006)^{C}
- The Animals with Sonny Boy Williamson (Charly, 2006)^{D}
- Live at the Club A Go-Go (Hallmark, 2008)

=== Post-lifetime compilation and reissue albums ===
- The Most Of (Music For Pleasure 5218, 1971)
- Best of the Animals (ABKCO 4426, 1973, 2-LP set)
- Best of the Animals (Springboard 4025, 1973)
- Best of the Animals (ABKCO 4324, 1975, 1-LP --- first U.S. compilation to feature the UK "correct" version of "We Gotta Get Out of This Place")
- The Best of the Animals (ABKCO, 1988)
- The Complete Animals (EMI, 1990)
- The Best of Eric Burdon and the Animals 1966–1968 (Polygram, 1991)^{E}
- Original Hits (Disky, 1995)^{F}
- The Best of the Animals (EMI, 1997)
- The Best of the Animals (Liberty, 2000)
- The Best of Eric Burdon and the Animals (Universal, 2001)^{G}
- Interesting Life (2003)
- Complete French EPs 1964/1967 (2003)
- Retrospective (ABKCO 93252, 2004, Hybrid SACD)
- The Hits (2010)

== Extended plays ==
| Title | EP details | Notes |
|---|---|---|
| The Animals is Here | Released: December 1964; Label: Columbia (SEG 8374); Format: 7-inch 45 RPM | Debut EP released, but not the first recorded. |
| The Animals | Released: March 1965; Label: Columbia (SEG 8400); Format: 7-inch 45 RPM | |
| The Animals No. 2 | Released: July 1965; Label: Columbia (SEG 8439); Format: 7-inch 45 RPM | |
| Animal Tracks | Released: September 1965; Label: Columbia (SEG 8499); Format: 7-inch 45 RPM | |
| The Animals Are Back | Released: October 1965; Label: Columbia (SEG 8452); Format: 7-inch 45 RPM | |
| In the Beginning There Was Early Animals | Released: 1966; Label: Decca (DFE 8643); Format: 7-inch 45 RPM | First recorded EP, but last released. It is also their first record, recorded 1963. |

== Singles ==
| Year | Title (A-side) | Peak chart positions | | | | | | | | U.S. record label | B-side From same album as A-side except where indicated | Certifications | Album |
| Year | Title (A-side) | UK | US | AUS | CAN | GER | NLD | NOR | SWE | U.S. record label | B-side From same album as A-side except where indicated | Certifications | Album |
|---|---|---|---|---|---|---|---|---|---|---|---|---|---|
| 1964 | "Baby Let Me Take You Home" | 21 | 102 | — | — | — | — | — | — | MGM Records | "Gonna Send You Back to Walker" | | The Animals |
| 1964 | "The House of the Rising Sun" | 1 | 1 | 2 | 1 | 10 | 5 | — | 4 | MGM Records | "Talkin' 'bout You" | BPI: 2× Platinum; IFPI DEN: Platinum; RMNZ: 4× Platinum | The Animals |
| 1964 | "Gonna Send You Back to Walker" | — | 57 | — | 25 | — | — | — | — | MGM Records | "Baby Let Me Take You Home" (A-side) | | The Animals |
| 1964 | "I'm Crying" | 8 | 19 | 40 | 6 | — | 44 | — | — | MGM Records | "Take It Easy" | | The Animals on Tour |
| 1965 | "Boom Boom" | — | 43 | 39 | 14 | — | — | — | — | MGM Records | "Blue Feeling" | | The Animals |
| 1965 | "Don't Let Me Be Misunderstood" | 3 | 15 | 29 | 4 | — | 26 | — | 7 | MGM Records | "Club A-GoGo" | | Animal Tracks |
| 1965 | "Bring It On Home to Me" | 7 | 32 | 42 | 7 | — | 3 | — | 1 | MGM Records | "For Miss Caulker" | | Animal Tracks |
| 1965 | "We Gotta Get out of This Place" | 2 | 13 | 49 | 2 | 31 | 12 | — | 6 | MGM Records | "I Can't Believe It" (US-only LP track) | | Animal Tracks |
| 1965 | "It's My Life" | 7 | 23 | 10 | 2 | — | 12 | 5 | 3 | MGM Records | "I'm Going to Change the World" (Non-LP track) | | The Best of The Animals |
| 1966 | "Inside-Looking Out" | 12 | 34 | 20 | 21 | 34 | 24 | — | 14 | MGM Records | "You're on My Mind" | | Animalization |
| 1966 | "Don't Bring Me Down" | 6 | 12 | 20 | 3 | 17 | 15 | — | 16 | MGM Records | "Cheating" | | Animalization |
| 1966 | "See See Rider" | — | 10 | 9 | 1 | — | — | — | — | MGM Records | "She'll Return It" | | Animalization |
| 1966 | "Help Me Girl" | 14 | 29 | 18 | 25 | — | — | — | — | MGM Records | "That Ain't Where It's At" | | Eric Is Here |
| 1967 | "When I Was Young" | 45 | 15 | 2 | 10 | 31 | 9 | — | — | MGM Records | "A Girl Named Sandoz" | | The Best of Eric Burdon and The Animals Vol. II |
| 1967 | "San Franciscan Nights" | 7 | 9 | 9 | 1 | 20 | 5 | — | — | MGM Records | "Good Times" | | Winds of Change |
| 1967 | "Good Times" | 20 | — | — | — | — | — | — | — | MGM Records | "San Franciscan Nights" (A-side) | | Winds of Change |
| 1967 | "Monterey" | — | 15 | 9 | 16 | — | — | — | 17 | MGM Records | "Ain't That So" (Non-LP track) | | The Twain Shall Meet |
| 1967 | "Anything" | — | 80 | 65 | 45 | — | — | — | — | MGM Records | "It's All Meat" | | Winds of Change |
| 1968 | "Sky Pilot" | 40 | 14 | 7 | 7 | — | — | — | — | MGM Records | "Sky Pilot (Part Two)" | | The Twain Shall Meet |
| 1968 | "White Houses" | — | 67 | 66 | 46 | — | — | — | — | MGM Records | "River Deep – Mountain High" (from Love Is) | | Every One of Us |
| 1969 | "Ring of Fire" | 35 | — | 8 | — | — | 2 | — | — | MGM Records | "I'm An Animal" | | Love Is |
| 1972 | "The House of the Rising Sun" | 25 | — | — | — | — | — | — | — | ABKCO Records | "Bring It On Home to Me" | | |
| 1982 | "The House of the Rising Sun" | 11 | — | — | — | — | — | — | — | | | | |
| 1983 | "The Night" | — | 48 | — | — | — | — | — | — | I.R.S. Records | "No John No" | | Ark |
| 1983 | "Love Is for All Time" | — | — | — | — | — | — | — | — | I.R.S. Records | "It's Too Late" | | Ark |

== Notes ==
A.The cover is original Animals lineup that made the recordings. No identification of recordings as being 1963. Licensed from Disky Music; Disky ownership interest uncertain. Five songs only, excluding "Let It Rock" and "C Jam Blues".
B.As described by reviewer Bruce Eder, "Recorded in December of 1963 at a live concert, this CD captures the Animals at their rawest and most animated on record, ripping ferociously through a bunch of standards (by Chuck Berry, James B. Odom, et al.), playing the crowd and making snide comments about their London rivals The Rolling Stones, all with Sonny Boy Williamson II hanging somewhere around the stage. Sundazed has actually found the original master to this oft-bootlegged piece of rock/blues history."
C.The album contains uncredited liner notes describing the early history of The Animals and the December 1963 recording by Giorgio Gomelsky. There is no indication on cover that the 2006 release is the 1963 live recording. The cover photo includes Dave Rowberry, who did not join the band until 1965, rather than Alan Price.
D.In fact being the seven live recordings of The Animals without Sonny Boy Williamson.
E.The album includes detailed liner notes by Rob Lipshutz; includes unedited single version of "Monterey", included on an album for the first time. Previous album inclusions, from the time of The Twain Shall Meet, involved fade-in intro; see Lipshutz liner notes.
F.Eighteen songs from the 1964–1965 period, licensed from EMI.
G.The album of ten tracks, principally 1967–1968 material, featuring the "new" Animals, yet the cover is of the 1963–1965 lineup with Alan Price. Also includes "Shake" and "All Night Long" from 1966. No liner notes, production details or recording times. Contains three actual "hits"—"Monterey", "Sky Pilot" and "San Franciscan Nights". "Sky Pilot" is the abridged, single version, though not so indicated.
