= The Best of The Animals =

The Best of the Animals

Greatest hits album by the Animals
- Released: February 1966
- Recorded: 22 January 1964 – 10 September 1965
- Genres: Rock; blues rock; British R&B
- Length: 33:25
- Label: MGM
- Producer: Mickie Most

The Animals U.S. chronology
Animal Tracks (1965)	The Best of the Animals (1966)	Animalization (1966)

Professional ratings
Review scores
Source	Rating
AllMusic	4/5 stars

The Best of The Animals is the first greatest hits collection by the British rock group the Animals. MGM Records released the album in February 1966 in the United States. It showcases the Animals' tough-edged pop hits combined with their more devoted blues and R&B workouts. The album has been reissued with some different tracks and a similar collection, The Most of Animals, was released in the United Kingdom in 1966.

== History ==
This was the first Animals album to feature new keyboardist Dave Rowberry in its photographs. Liner notes by Record Beat's June Harris extolled the musical and cultural virtues of the group and emphasized how close she was to the group. However, overall copyediting was poor and three of the members' names were misspelled. In addition, "I'm In Love Again" was incorrectly attributed to Fats Domino and Dave Bartholomew, as it was on The Animals debut album. It is actually a cover of Jimmy Reed's "In The Morning" written by Al Smith and Tommy Tucker.

The album was a great commercial success in the U.S., peaking at number six on the Billboard 200, the highest such mark of their career, and remaining on the chart for over two years. By July 1966 it had been certified as a gold record, their only album ever to attain that status.

In his 1979 volume Stranded: Rock and Roll for a Desert Island, famed rock critic Greil Marcus selected The Best of the Animals for inclusion on same, writing: "This was trash R&B from Newcastle, England, and especially when the focus shifted from American blues to savage pleas for release from working-class slums, more powerful than it had any right to be." In 1997, Rolling Stone magazine placed The Best of the Animals into the 1960s section of its Rolling Stone 200: The Essential Rock Collection list.

Other compilation albums by the same name (and sometimes even the same cover), but different contents have appeared over the years.

== Track listing ==
Side one
No.	Title	Writer(s)	Recording date	Length
1.	"It's My Life" (Single A-Side, 1965)	Roger Atkins; Carl D'Errico	10 September 1965	3:09
2.	"Gonna Send You Back to Walker" (B-Side of "Baby Let Me Take You Home", 1964)	Johnnie Mae Matthews; John Hammond Jr.	12 February 1964	2:20
3.	"Bring It On Home to Me" (Single A-side, 1965)	Sam Cooke	20 March 1965	2:40
4.	"I'm Mad Again" (From The Animals, 1964)	John Lee Hooker	31 July 1964	4:15
5.	"The House of the Rising Sun" (Full length version, originally released as a single A-Side in edited form, 1964)	Traditional, arranged by Alan Price	18 May 1964	4:29
Total length:				16:53

Side two
No.	Title	Writer(s)	Recording date	Length
1.	"We Gotta Get out of This Place" (US single A-Side version, 1965)	Barry Mann; Cynthia Weil	15 June 1965	3:17
2.	"Boom Boom" (Single A-Side, 1964)	John Lee Hooker	22 January 1964	2:57
3.	"I'm in Love Again" (From The Animals, 1964)	Dave Bartholomew; Fats Domino	31 July 1964	2:59
4.	"Roberta" (From Animal Tracks, 1965)	Huey "Piano" Smith; Johnny Vincent	16 November 1964	2:04
5.	"I'm Crying" (Single A-Side, 1964)	Eric Burdon; Price	31 July 1964	2:49
6.	"Don't Let Me Be Misunderstood" (Single A-Side, 1965)	Bennie Benjamin; Sol Marcus; Gloria Caldwell	16 November 1964	2:26
Total length:				16:32

== 1987 CD reissue ==
Presumably their first compilation on CD, it featured the same album cover and the same hit singles as their original 1966 US collection, but had more and different other tracks. It was later re-issued in 2000 & 2014 and is the version featured on streaming.

1. "The House of the Rising Sun"
2. "I'm Crying"
3. "Baby Let Me Take You Home"
4. "Around and Around"
5. "Talkin' 'bout You"
6. "Don't Let Me Be Misunderstood"
7. "Boom Boom"
8. "Dimples"
9. "We Gotta Get Out of This Place (UK Version)"
10. "I'm in Love Again"
11. "Bury My Body"
12. "Gonna Send You Back to Walker"
13. "Story of Bo Diddley"
14. "It's My Life"
15. "Bring It On Home to Me"

== 1997 reissue ==
The album contains many of their hits from the mid-1960s, including "The House of the Rising Sun" and "Don't Let Me Be Misunderstood". The first 12 tracks are the same as the 1971 UK compilation The Most of the Animals.

1. "The House of the Rising Sun" (Traditional, arr. Alan Price) – 4:32
2. "We Gotta Get Out of This Place" (Barry Mann, Cynthia Weil) – 3:15
3. "Road Runner" (Bo Diddley) – 2:51
4. "Let the Good Times Roll" (Leonard Lee) – 1:56
5. "Hallelujah I Love Her So" (Ray Charles) – 2:48
6. "I'm Going to Change the World" (Eric Burdon) – 3:37
7. "Bring It On Home to Me" (Sam Cooke) – 2:45
8. "Worried Life Blues" (M. Merriweather, Wabash) – 4:13
9. "Baby Let Me Take You Home" (Bob Russell, Wes Farrell) – 2:22
10. "For Miss Caulker" (Eric Burdon) – 3:59
11. "I Believe to My Soul" (Ray Charles, Alan Learner) – 3:25
12. "How You've Changed" (Chuck Berry) – 3:15
13. "Don't Let Me Be Misunderstood" (Bennie Benjamin, Sol Marcus, Gloria Caldwell) – 2:30
14. "It's My Life" (Roger Atkins, Carl D'Errico) – 3:09
15. "Club-A-Gogo" (Eric Burdon, Alan Price) – 2:22
16. "I'm Crying" (Alan Price, Eric Burdon) – 2:48
17. "Boom Boom" (John Lee Hooker) – 3:18
18. "Memphis Tennessee" (Chuck Berry) – 3:07
19. "Story of Bo Diddley" (Bo Diddley) – 5:43
20. "Dimples" (John Lee Hooker) – 3:17

== Personnel ==
The Animals

- Eric Burdon – lead vocals
- Alan Price – keyboards except as indicated below
- Dave Rowberry – keyboards and backing vocals on "We Gotta Get out of This Place" and "It's My Life"
- Hilton Valentine – guitar
- Chas Chandler – bass
- John Steel – drums

== Charts ==
Chart (1966)	Peak position
US Billboard Top LPs	6
