= The Most of the Animals =

Compilation album by the Animals
- Released: 1 April 1966
- Recorded: 1964–1965
- Genre: Blues rock
- Length: 41:36
- Label: Columbia
- Producer: Mickie Most

the Animals UK chronology
Animal Tracks (1965)	The Most of the Animals (1966)	Animalisms (1966)

Professional ratings
Review scores
Source	Rating
AllMusic	3/5 stars
Record Mirror	4/5 stars
Sputnikmusic	4.2/5 stars

The Most of the Animals is the title of a number of different compilation albums by the British blues rock group the Animals. Although track listing varies, all feature only songs from 1964 and 1965. The title is derived from the name of their then producer Mickie Most (see also The Most of Herman's Hermits).

The first album was released on 1 April 1966 by Columbia (SX 6035). Most of the material had not featured on either of their previous two UK LPs. The album reached number four - their highest position so far on the UK album chart (both previous LPs having peaked at number six). It was their final album for EMI-owned Columbia before moving to Decca.

The album was issued on EMI's budget Music for Pleasure label in 1971 (MFP 5218) with a different track listing. This version also charted, reaching number 17. This is the version of the album that has spent the longest in print, being available on LP and cassette throughout the 1970s and 1980s and is still available in extended form on CD. It is also the basis for the 1997 release The Best of the Animals. Another version was released in 1993 in Australia.

== 1966 track listing ==
The album was released by Columbia (EMI) in April 1966.

=== Side one ===
1. "We Gotta Get Out of This Place" (Barry Mann, Cynthia Weil)
2. "Don't Let Me Be Misunderstood" (Bennie Benjamin, Sol Marcus, Gloria Caldwell)
3. "Boom Boom" (John Lee Hooker)
4. "Baby Let Me Take You Home" (Bob Russell, Wes Farrell)
5. "Bright Lights, Big City" (Jimmy Reed)
6. "I'm Crying" (Alan Price, Eric Burdon)
7. "The House of the Rising Sun" (Traditional, arr. Alan Price)

=== Side two ===
1. "It's My Life" (Roger Atkins, Carl D'Errico)
2. "Mess Around" (Ahmet Ertegun)
3. "Dimples" (John Lee Hooker)
4. "Bring It On Home to Me" (Sam Cooke)
5. "Gonna Send You Back to Walker" (Matthews/Hammond)
6. "I'm Mad Again" (John Lee Hooker)
7. "Talkin' 'bout You" (Ray Charles)

== 1971 track listing ==
Released by Music for Pleasure (EMI) in 1971.

=== Side one ===
1. "The House of the Rising Sun" (Traditional, arr. Alan Price) – 4:32
2. "We Gotta Get Out of This Place" (Barry Mann, Cynthia Weil) – 3:15
3. "Road Runner" (Bo Diddley) – 2:51
4. "Let the Good Times Roll" (Leonard Lee) – 1:56
5. "Hallelujah I Love Her So" (Ray Charles) – 2:48
6. "I'm Going to Change the World" (Eric Burdon) – 3:37

=== Side two ===
1. "Bring It On Home to Me" (Sam Cooke) – 2:45
2. "Worried Life Blues" (M. Merriweather, Wabash) – 4:13
3. "Baby Let Me Take You Home" (Bob Russell, Wes Farrell) – 2:22
4. "For Miss Caulker" (Eric Burdon) – 3:59
5. "I Believe to My Soul" (Ray Charles, Learner) – 3:25
6. "How You've Changed" (Chuck Berry) – 3:15

=== CD bonus tracks ===
1. "Don't Let Me Be Misunderstood" (Bennie Benjamin, Sol Marcus, Gloria Caldwell) – 2:30
2. "It's My Life" (Roger Atkins, Carl D'Errico) – 3:09
3. "Club-A-Gogo" (Eric Burdon, Alan Price) – 2:22
4. "I'm Crying" (Alan Price, Eric Burdon) – 2:48

== 1993 track listing ==
Released by EMI Music Australia in 1993.

Side one
No.	Title	Writer(s)	Length
1.	"The House of the Rising Sun"	Traditional, arr. Alan Price	4:31
2.	"Boom Boom"	John Lee Hooker	3:19
3.	"Baby Let Me Take You Home"	Bob Russell; Wes Farrell	2:23
4.	"Gonna Send You Back to Walker"	(Matthews/Hammond)	2:28
5.	"Around and Around"	Chuck Berry	2:44
6.	"I'm Crying"	Alan Price; Eric Burdon	2:47
7.	"I'm Mad Again"	John Lee Hooker	4:16
8.	"She Said Yeah"	Larry Williams	2:20
9.	"The Girl Can't Help It"	Bobby Troup	2:21
10.	"Story of Bo Diddley"	Bo Diddley	5:45
11.	"We Gotta Get Out of this Place"	Barry Mann; Cynthia Weil	3:14
12.	"Let the Good Times Roll"	Shirley Goodman; Leonard Lee	1:55
13.	"Bring It On Home to Me"	Sam Cooke	2:43
14.	"It's My Life"	Roger Atkins; Carl D'Errico	3:09
15.	"Memphis Tennessee"	Chuck Berry	3:06
16.	"Don't Let Me Be Misunderstood"	Bennie Benjamin; Sol Marcus; Horace Ott (as Gloria Caldwell)	3:06
17.	"Bright Lights, Big City"	Jimmy Reed	2:56
18.	"Dimples"	John Lee Hooker	2:52
19.	"I've Been Around"	Fats Domino	1:38
20.	"Road Runner"	Bo Diddley	2:48

== Charts ==
Chart (1966)	Peak position
UK Albums Chart Official Charts Company	4
