= The Animals on Tour =

Studio album by The Animals
- Released: February 1965
- Recorded: 22 January–16 November 1964
- Genre: Rock; blues rock; rhythm and blues
- Length: 34:14
- Label: MGM
- Producer: Mickie Most

The Animals U.S. chronology
The Animals (1964)	The Animals on Tour (1965)	Animal Tracks (1965)

Singles from The Animals on Tour
- 1. "I'm Crying" Released: Sept 1964; 2. "Boom Boom" Released: Nov 1964

The Animals on Tour is the second American studio album by British rock band The Animals. It was released by MGM Records in February 1965 (see 1965 in music).

== Overview ==
The album included two previously released singles, "I'm Crying" and "Boom Boom" and is mostly made up of leftovers from the British The Animals album (not included on the American version) and unreleased tracks intended for the British version of Animal Tracks.

The album was available in both mono and stereo formats. The songs on the stereo release were all rechanneled, which means that the original songs were mixed in mono and were re-mixed to simulate stereo. Rechanneling often occurred on American releases by British artists.

Despite what the title indicates, The Animals on Tour is not a live album; it is entirely made up of studio recordings. The album reached #99 on the Billboard 200.

The album peaked at No. 99 on the Billboard Top LPs during a nine-week run on the chart.

== Track listing ==
Side one
No.	Title	Writer(s)	Recording Date	Length
1.	"Boom Boom" (Edited version without guitar solo, single A-Side, 1964)	John Lee Hooker	22 January 1964	2:57
2.	"How You've Changed"	Chuck Berry	16 November 1964	3:10
3.	"Mess Around"	A. Nugetre	16 November 1964	2:18
4.	"Bright Lights, Big City"	Jimmy Reed	16 November 1964	2:52
5.	"I Believe to My Soul"	Ray Charles	16 November 1964	3:23
6.	"Worried Life Blues"	Big Maceo Merriweather	16 November 1964	4:09
Total length:				18:49

Side two
No.	Title	Writer(s)	Recording Date	Length
1.	"Let the Good Times Roll"	Shirley Goodman, Leonard Lee	16 November 1964	1:52
2.	"I Ain't Got You"	Calvin Carter	16 November 1964	2:27
3.	"Hallelujah, I Love Her So"	Ray Charles	16 November 1964	2:43
4.	"I'm Crying"	Eric Burdon; Alan Price	31 July 1964	2:49
5.	"Dimples" (Different version than that released on the UK album The Animals)	John Lee Hooker; James Bracken	22 January 1964	3:15
6.	"She Said Yeah"	Roddy Jackson; Sonny Christy	31 July 1964	2:19
Total length:				15:25

== Personnel ==
The Animals

- Eric Burdon – vocals
- Alan Price – keyboards
- Hilton Valentine – guitar
- Chas Chandler – bass
- John Steel – drums

Technical

- Val Valentin – engineer

== Charts ==
Chart (1971)	Peak position
US Billboard Top LPs	99
