= Greatest Hits Live (Rip It to Shreds) =

Live album by The Animals
- Released: August 1984
- Genre: Rock
- Label: I.R.S.

The Animals chronology
Ark (1983)	Greatest Hits Live (Rip It to Shreds) (1984)

Professional ratings
Review scores
Source	Rating
AllMusic	2/5 stars

Greatest Hits Live (Rip It to Shreds) is a live album by the original members of The Animals. It was released in 1984.

== Background ==
The album documents the 1983 concert tour that accompanied the second, and last, reunion attempt of the original group.

While approximately two-thirds of the tour's shows were taken from Ark, the 1983 reunion album, and one-third were drawn from the line-up's original 1960s recordings, Greatest Hits Live focuses almost exclusively on the older material.

== Track listing ==
1. "It's Too Late" (Eric Burdon. John Steriling)
2. "House of the Rising Sun" (Traditional, arr. Alan Price)
3. "It's My Life" (Roger Atkins, Carl D'Errico)
4. "Don't Bring Me Down" (Gerry Goffin, Carole King)
5. "Don't Let Me Be Misunderstood" (Bennie Benjamin, Sol Marcus, Gloria Caldwell)
6. "I'm Crying" (Alan Price, Eric Burdon)
7. "Bring It On Home to Me" (Sam Cooke)
8. "O Lucky Man!" (Alan Price)
9. "Boom Boom" (John Lee Hooker)
10. "We've Gotta Get out of This Place" (Barry Mann, Cynthia Weil)
11. "When I Was Young" (Eric Burdon, Vic Briggs, John Weider, Barry Jenkins, Danny McCulloch)

== Personnel ==
=== The Animals ===
- Eric Burdon – vocals
- Hilton Valentine – guitar
- Alan Price – keyboards, background vocals
- Chas Chandler – bass, background vocals
- John Steel – drums

=== Additional personnel ===
- Zoot Money – keyboards
- Steve Grant – guitar, synthesizer, background vocals
- Steve Gregory – tenor saxophone, baritone saxophone
- Nippy Noya – percussion
