= Animal Tracks (American album) =

Studio album by The Animals
- Released: September 1965
- Recorded: 31 July 1964 – 15 June 1965
- Genres: Rock; blues rock; rhythm and blues
- Length: 31:40
- Label: MGM
- Producer: Mickie Most

The Animals U.S. chronology
The Animals on Tour (1965)	Animal Tracks (1965)	The Best of The Animals (1966)

Singles from Animal Tracks
- 1. "Don't Let Me Be Misunderstood" Released: February 1965; 2. "Bring It On Home to Me" Released: April 1965; 3. "We Gotta Get Out of This Place" Released: August 1965

Professional ratings
Review scores
Source	Rating
AllMusic	3.5/5 stars

Animal Tracks is the Animals' third album in the United States, released as both an LP and reel-to-reel tape.

== Overview ==
Musically, it combined the group's recent hit singles and tracks of assorted vintage that had not been included on either of The Animals' first two U.S. albums. As such it bore little resemblance to the band's British release also named Animal Tracks from four months earlier. "The Story of Bo Diddley" is an adaptation and expansion of a song recorded by Bo Diddley in 1960, utilizing some of the original lyrics but with additional verses and melody recapping the musician's life in a talking blues style.

The album peaked at No. 57 on the Billboard Top LPs during a 25-week run on the chart.

== Track listing ==
Side one
No.	Title	Writer(s)	Recording date	Length
1.	"We Gotta Get Out of This Place" (US single A-Side version, 1965)	Barry Mann; Cynthia Weil	15 June 1965	3:17
2.	"Take It Easy" (B-Side of "I'm Crying, 1964)	Eric Burdon; Alan Price	31 July 1964	2:51
3.	"Bring It On Home to Me" (Single A-Side, 1965)	Sam Cooke	20 March 1965	2:40
4.	"The Story of Bo Diddley" (From The Animals, 1964)	Eric Burdon; Ellas McDaniel	31 July 1964	5:42
Total length:				14:30

Side two
No.	Title	Writer(s)	Recording date	Length
1.	"Don't Let Me Be Misunderstood" (Single A-Side, 1965)	Bennie Benjamin; Gloria Caldwell; Sol Marcus	16 November 1964	2:25
2.	"I Can't Believe It" (B-Side of "We Gotta Get Out Of This Place", 1965)	Eric Burdon	15 June 1965	3:35
3.	"Club A-Go-Go" (B-Side of "Don't Let Me Be Misunderstood", 1965)	Burdon; Price	16 November 1964	2:19
4.	"Roberta" (From Animal Tracks (UK version), 1965)	Al Smith; John Vincent	16 November 1964	2:04
5.	"Bury My Body" (From The Animals, 1964)	Traditional, arranged by Alan Price	31 July 1964	2:52
6.	"For Miss Caulker" (From Animal Tracks (UK version), 1965)	Eric Burdon	20 March 1965	3:55
Total length:				17:10

== Personnel ==
The Animals

- Eric Burdon – vocals
- Alan Price – keyboards except as indicated below
- Dave Rowberry – keyboards on "We Gotta Get Out Of This Place" and "I Can't Believe It"
- Hilton Valentine – guitar
- Chas Chandler – bass
- John Steel – drums

Production

- Mickie Most – producer, liner notes
- Val Valentin – engineer
- George Joseph – photography

== Charts ==
Chart (1965)	Peak position
US Billboard Top LPs	57
