= Animal tracks (disambiguation) =

Animal tracks are imprints left behind in soil, snow, or mud, or on some other ground surface, by an animal walking across it.

Animal track may also refer to:

- Animal Tracks (American album), a 1965 album by the Animals
- Animal Tracks (British album), a 1965 album by the Animals

== See also ==
- Animal tracking
