= The Animals (album) =

1964 album by the Animals

Studio album by the Animals
- Released: September 1964
- Recorded: 22 January – 31 July 1964
- Genres: R&B; blues rock
- Length: 32:41
- Label: MGM
- Producer: Mickie Most

The Animals US chronology
The Animals (1964)	The Animals on Tour (1965)

Singles from The Animals
- 1. "Baby Let Me Take You Home" / "Gonna Send You Back to Walker" Released: August 1964; 2. "House of the Rising Sun" / "Talkin' 'bout You" Released: August 1964

The Animals

Studio album by the Animals
- Released: 6 November 1964
- Recorded: 31 July 1964 (except 22 January 1964 for "Boom Boom")
- Genres: R&B; British R&B; blues rock
- Length: 38:38
- Label: Columbia
- Producer: Mickie Most

The Animals UK chronology
The Animals (1964)	Animal Tracks (1965)

Singles from The Animals
- 1. "Boom Boom" Released: 1964

Professional ratings
Review scores
Source	Rating
AllMusic	3.5/5 stars
Encyclopedia of Popular Music	4/5 stars

The Animals is the self-titled debut album by the British R&B/blues rock band the Animals. The American version was released in late summer 1964, the album introduced the States to the "drawling, dirty R&B sound (with the emphasis on the B)" that typified the group.

The British versions was released in the United Kingdom on 6 November 1964 on EMI's Columbia Records. The album reached No. 6 in the UK Albums Chart and spent 20 weeks on the chart.

== Overview ==
The American album includes several R&B standards, written by the likes of Chuck Berry and John Lee Hooker, as well as the number one single "House of the Rising Sun", here presented in its truncated-for-radio form (it would be restored to full length on the February 1966 compilation The Best of the Animals, and later CD and digital reissues of The Animals would feature the full-length recording). "I'm in Love Again" is incorrectly listed as being written by Fats Domino and Dave Bartholomew. It is actually a cover of Jimmy Reed's "In the Morning", which was penned by Al Smith and Tommy Tucker.

The album peaked at No. 7 on the Billboard Top LPs during a twenty seven-week run on the US albums chart.

The British album was released a month later, the group's debut album there albeit with substantially differing contents.

Professional ratings
Review scores
Source	Rating
AllMusic	link
Uncut	4/5 stars

== Track listing ==
American album

Side one
No.	Title	Writer(s)	Recording date	Length
1.	"The House of the Rising Sun" (Edited single version)	Traditional, arranged by Alan Price	18 May 1964	2:59
2.	"The Girl Can't Help It"	Bobby Troup	31 July 1964	2:20
3.	"Blue Feeling"	Jimmy Henshaw	22 January 1964	2:28
4.	"Baby Let Me Take You Home"	Wes Farrell; Bert Russell	12 February 1964	2:18
5.	"The Right Time"	Lew Herman	31 July 1964	3:42
6.	"Talkin' 'bout You" (Edited single version)	Ray Charles	22 January 1964	1:55

Side two
No.	Title	Writer(s)	Recording date	Length
7.	"Around and Around"	Chuck Berry	31 July 1964	2:44
8.	"I'm in Love Again"	Dave Bartholomew; Fats Domino	31 July 1964	2:59
9.	"Gonna Send You Back to Walker"	Johnnie Mae Matthews	12 February 1964	2:22
10.	"Memphis, Tennessee"	Berry	31 July 1964	3:04
11.	"I'm Mad Again"	John Lee Hooker	31 July 1964	4:15
12.	"I've Been Around"	Domino	31 July 1964	1:35
Total length:				32:41

British album

Side one
No.	Title	Writer(s)	Length
1.	"Story of Bo Diddley"	Eric Burdon, Ellas McDaniel	5:45
2.	"Bury My Body"	Traditional; arranged by Alan Price	2:52
3.	"Dimples"	John Lee Hooker, James Bracken	3:14
4.	"I've Been Around"	Fats Domino	1:39
5.	"I'm in Love Again"	Domino, Dave Bartholomew	3:03
6.	"The Girl Can't Help It"	Bobby Troup	2:23

Side two
No.	Title	Writer(s)	Length
7.	"I'm Mad Again"	Hooker	4:18
8.	"She Said Yeah"	Roddy Jackson, Don Christy	2:21
9.	"The Right Time"	Lew Herman	3:47
10.	"Memphis Tennessee"	Chuck Berry	3:08
11.	"Boom Boom"	Hooker	3:20
12.	"Around and Around"	Berry	2:48

== Personnel ==
The Animals

- Eric Burdon – lead vocals
- Hilton Valentine – guitar, vocals
- Alan Price – keyboards, vocals
- Chas Chandler – bass guitar, vocals
- John Steel – drums, percussion

Technical

- Mickie Most – producer
- Val Valentin – engineer

== Charts ==
American album:

Chart (1964)	Peak position
US Billboard Top LPs	7

British album:

Chart (1964–66)	Peak position
Finnish Mitä Suomi Soittaa LPs Chart	9
UK Melody Maker Top Ten LPs	6
UK New Musical Express Best Selling LPs in Britain	2
UK Record Retailer LPs Chart	6

Chart (2024)	Peak position
Hungarian Physical Albums (MAHASZ)	11
