= Hoagy =

Hoagy may refer to:

- Hoagy Carmichael (born Hoagland Howard Carmichael; 1899–1981), American composer, pianist, singer, actor, and bandleader
- Hoagy Lands (1936–2002), American soul singer born Victor I. Hoagland, Sr.

== See also ==
- Hoagie, another name for a submarine sandwich
- Hoagie roll, a type of long flat roll used to prepare hoagie sandwiches
