= The Ultimate Collection (John Lee Hooker album) =

The Ultimate Collection (1948–1990)

Greatest hits album by John Lee Hooker
- Released: 1991
- Recorded: 1948–1990
- Genre: Blues
- Length: 104:27
- Label: Rhino

John Lee Hooker chronology
The Best of John Lee Hooker (1991)	The Ultimate Collection (1948–1990) (1991)	Mr. Lucky (1991)

Professional ratings
Review scores
Source	Rating
Allmusic	5/5 stars
The Village Voice	A−
The Penguin Guide to Blues Recordings	4/4 stars

The Ultimate Collection (1948–1990) is a 1991 compilation album by John Lee Hooker. In 2003, the album was rated 375 on the Rolling Stone's "500 Greatest Albums of All Time", and 377 in a 2012 revised list.

== Track listing ==
Disc 1
No.	Title	Writer(s)	Release Year	Length
1.	"Teachin' the Blues"	John Lee Hooker	1961	3:27
2.	"Boogie Chillen'"	Bernard Besman, Hooker	1948	3:10
3.	"Sally Mae"	Besman, Hooker	1948	3:09
4.	"Let Your Daddy Ride"	Hooker	1951	2:40
5.	"Crawlin' King Snake"	Tony Hollins	1949	3:02
6.	"Weeping Willow Boogie"	Hooker	1949	2:49
7.	"Hobo Blues"	Joe Josea, Besman, Hooker	1949	3:03
8.	"Huckle up Baby"	Besman, Hooker	1950	2:50
9.	"I'm in the Mood"	Besman, Hooker	1951	3:07
10.	"John L's House Rent Boogie"	Hooker	1951	3:02
11.	"No More Doggin'"	Rosco Gordon, Jules Taub	1960	2:48
12.	"I Need Some Money"	Berry Gordy, Smokey Robinson	1960	2:28
13.	"Frisco Blues"	Hooker	1963	2:45
14.	"Dimples"	James Bracken, Hooker	1956	2:14
15.	"It Serves Me Right To Suffer"	Hooker	1965	3:38
16.	"Bottle Up and Go"	Hooker	1966	2:26

Disc 2
No.	Title	Writer(s)	Release Year	Length
1.	"Boom Boom"	Hooker	1962	2:34
2.	"Big Legs, Tight Skirt"	Hooker	1965	2:20
3.	"You Know, I Know"	Hooker	1966	4:05
4.	"One Bourbon, One Scotch, One Beer"	Rudy Toombs	1966	3:06
5.	"Let's Go Out Tonight"	Hooker	1966	7:12
6.	"I Cover the Waterfront"	Johnny Green, Edward Heyman	1967	4:04
7.	"She's Mine (Keep Your Hands to Yourself)"	Hooker	1962	2:24
8.	"Back Biters and Syndicators"	Al Smith, Hooker	1968	2:52
9.	"Think Twice Before You Go"	Smith	1968	2:06
10.	"Shake It Baby"	Hooker	1963	4:08
11.	"I'm Bad Like Jesse James"	Hooker	1967	5:20
12.	"Peavine" (with Canned Heat)	Hooker	1971	5:08
13.	"Burning Hell" (with Canned Heat)	Besman, Hooker	1971	3:58
14.	"Terraplane Blues" (with Roy Rogers)	Robert Johnson	1987	2:56
15.	"I'm in the Mood" (with Roy Rogers & Bonnie Raitt)	Besman, Hooker	1990	5:36
