= Broadway-Blues-Ballads =

Studio album by Nina Simone
- Released: November 1964
- Recorded: New York City, 1964
- Genre: Vocal, soul, jazz, folk, blues
- Length: 37:22
- Label: Philips
- Producer: Hal Mooney

Nina Simone chronology
Nina Simone in Concert (1964)	Broadway-Blues-Ballads (1964)	I Put a Spell on You (1965)

Professional ratings
Review scores
Source	Rating
AllMusic	3/5 stars
The Encyclopedia of Popular Music	3/5 stars
Pitchfork Media	8.0/10

Broadway-Blues-Ballads is an album by the singer/pianist/songwriter Nina Simone, released in 1964. The album features Simone singing a few standards and folk songs, as well as six compositions by Bennie Benjamin and Sol Marcus.

== Track listing ==
No.	Title	Writer(s)	Length
1.	"Don't Let Me Be Misunderstood"	Bennie Benjamin, Gloria Caldwell, Sol Marcus	2:46
2.	"Night Song"	Lee Adams, Charles Strouse	3:06
3.	"The Laziest Gal in Town"	Cole Porter	2:19
4.	"Something Wonderful"	Oscar Hammerstein II, Richard Rodgers	2:46
5.	"Don't Take All Night"	Bennie Benjamin, Sol Marcus	2:54
6.	"Nobody"	Alex Rogers, Bert Williams	4:18
7.	"I Am Blessed"	Bennie Benjamin, Sol Marcus	2:57
8.	"Of This I'm Sure"	Bennie Benjamin, Sol Marcus	2:37
9.	"See-Line Woman"	Traditional American folk, George Bass, Nina Simone	2:38
10.	"Our Love (Will See Us Through)"	Bennie Benjamin, Sol Marcus	3:01
11.	"How Can I?"	Bennie Benjamin, Sol Marcus	2:05
12.	"The Last Rose of Summer"	Thomas Moore, Richard Alfred Milliken, Nina Simone	3:08

CD release bonus track
No.	Title	Writer(s)	Length
13.	"A Monster"	Bennie Benjamin, Sol Marcus	2:47

== Personnel ==
- Nina Simone – piano, vocals on all tracks, and arranger on track 10
- Rudy Stevenson – flute on track 9
- Lisle Atkinson – percussion on track 9
- Bobby Hamilton – drums on track 9
- Horace Ott – arranger and conductor on tracks 1,5,7,8,10,11,13
- Hal Mooney – arranger and conductor on tracks 2,3,4,6,12
- unknown orchestra
