= Hoagy Lands =

American singer (1936–2002)

Victor I. Hoagland Sr. (May 4, 1936 – January 12, 2002), known professionally as Hoagy Lands, was an American soul singer.

== Biography ==
Lands was born in New Brunswick, New Jersey, United States. His father was Afro-Cuban and his mother was an African American of American Indian descent, Lands formed a group at Roosevelt Junior High School in Elizabeth, New Jersey that was called TNB (The New Brunswick) Dynaflows.

His recording career spanned from the late 1950s on into the mid-1970s. He was a backup singer for The Drifters when they recorded their major hit, but was not credited.

He recorded a few duets with Lily Field. He made appearances in England shortly before his death in 2002, in Orange, New Jersey, following a heart surgery.

His grandson is recording artist Jaheim.

== Discography ==
- Ivory (unknown number) – Oo-Be-Do / You're Only Young Once – 1959
- Judi 054 – (I'm Gonna) Cry Some Tears / Lighted Windows – 1961
- ABC-Paramount 10171 – (I'm Gonna) Cry Some Tears / Lighted Windows – 1961
- MGM K-13041 – My Tears Are Dry / It's Gonna Be Morning – 1961
- MGM K-13062 – Goodnight Irene / It Ain't Easy As That – 1961
- ABC-Paramount 10392 – Tender Years / I'm Yours – 1963
- Atlantic 2217 – Baby Come On Home / Baby Let Me Hold Your Hand (Backing vocals by Cissy Houston, Dee Dee Warwick and Judy Clay – Eric Gale on guitar) – 1964
- Laurie 3349 – Theme From The Other Side / Friends And Lovers Don't Go Together – 1966
- Laurie 3361 – Theme From The Other Side / September – 1967
- Laurie 3372 – Yesterday / Forever in My Heart- 1967
- Laurie 3381 – The Next in Line / Please Don't Talk About Me When I'm Gone (Backing vocals by The Chiffons) – 1967
- Laurie 3463 – Two Years and a Thousand Tears (Since I Left Augusta) / White Gardenia – 1968

=== With Lily Fields ===
- Stardust 028 – I'm Yours / The Tender Years – 1963
- Spectrum 116 – Beautiful Music / Crying Candle – 1969
- Spectrum 118 – Sweet Soul (Brother) / A Boy in a Man's World – 1970
- Spectrum 122 – Do You Know What Life Is All About / Why Didn't You Let Me Know – 1972
- Spectrum 129 – Reminisce / Why Didn't You Let Me Know – 1972
- Spectrum 130 – A Man Ain't No Stronger Than His Heart / Do It Twice – 1972
- Paramount 0232 – Mary Ann / Pledging My Love – 1973
- Spectrum 140 – The Bell Ringer / (Instrumental) – 1976

== In popular culture ==
Lands’ 1964 version of “Baby Let Me Hold Your Hand” served as the template for the song “Baby Let Me Take You Home” released on the first single by The Animals.

Lands' recording of Lighted Windows was played over the end titles of Season 4, Episode 8 of Orange Is the New Black in June 2016.
