= Mess Around =

- Swedish release picture sleeve

Single by Ray Charles

from the album Ray Charles (or, Hallelujah I Love Her So)
- B-side: "Funny (But I Still Love You)"
- Released: June 19, 1953
- Recorded: May 17, 1953
- Genre: R&B, stride, blues
- Label: Atlantic 999
- Songwriter: Ahmet Ertegun
- Producer: Ahmet Ertegun

Ray Charles singles chronology
"The Sun's Gonna Shine Again" (1953)	"Mess Around" (1953)	"Feelin' Sad" (1954)

"Mess Around" is a song written by Ahmet Ertegun, co-founder and then-vice-president of Atlantic Records, under the pseudonym of A. Nugetre, or "Nuggy". It was performed by Ray Charles, and was one of Charles's first hits.

== Origins and composition ==
Ertegun claimed his inspiration for writing "Mess Around" was stride pianist Pete Johnson. Earlier versions of the tune's New Orleans boogie piano riff can be heard in songs from the early 1930s and 1940s, with perhaps the earliest example being Charles "Cow Cow" Davenport's "Cow Cow Blues" from 1928. Dr. John also spoke about the origin of this tune on his Dr John Teaches New Orleans Piano series of DVDs.

The song's lyrics urge listeners to dance ("everybody do the Mess Around"), along with a few other key phrases, notably "see that girl with the red dress on", harkening back to "Pinetop's Boogie Woogie", Pinetop Smith's early boogie-woogie classic.

== Release ==
"Mess Around" became a big R&B charted hit when released as a single in early 1953. It was later included on Charles's 1957 debut album, Ray Charles.

== Cover versions ==
- It was covered by the Animals in 1965 on the albums The Animals on Tour and Animal Tracks.
- Dr. John included it in his 1972 collection of New Orleans classics Dr. John's Gumbo.
- Professor Longhair covered the song on several of his albums, including Rock 'n' Roll Gumbo (1974).
- It was covered by the UK new wave band Squeeze and featured on their 1980 album Argybargy deluxe edition as a live version. Jools Holland said Ray Charles was so impressed that Squeeze were doing a version, Ray sent the band his suit.

== In popular culture ==
- The song was featured in the American comedy film Planes, Trains and Automobiles (1987) during a scene in which Del Griffith (John Candy) tries to dance to the song on the radio while driving a car at night on the freeway, and while his passenger Neal Page (Steve Martin) sleeps beside him. This scene has been parodied in the Family Guy special It's a Trap! (2011) and Ted 2 (2015).
- It was featured in the 2004 biographical film Ray of Ray Charles.
- The song was played on the piano in the series Lucifer, season one, episode nine, by Lucifer Morningstar and Father Frank.
