= Animal Tracks (British album) =

Studio album by the Animals
- Released: 7 May 1965
- Recorded: 16–17 November 1964; 20 March 1965
- Genres: Blues rock, R&B
- Length: 32:25
- Label: Columbia
- Producer: Mickie Most

The Animals UK chronology
The Animals (1964)	Animal Tracks (1965)	The Most of the Animals (1966)

Professional ratings
Review scores
Source	Rating
AllMusic	3.5/5 stars
Encyclopedia of Popular Music	3/5 stars

Animal Tracks is the second studio album by British R&B/blues rock band the Animals. It was released in May 1965, on Columbia, and was the group's last album with the full participation of Alan Price until the release of the original quintet's 1977 reunion album, Before We Were So Rudely Interrupted. It reached number six on the Record Retailer Albums Chart and remained there for 26 weeks.

== Track listing ==
Side one
No.	Title	Writer(s)	Length
1.	"Mess Around"	Ahmet Ertegun	2:22
2.	"How You've Changed"	Chuck Berry	3:14
3.	"Hallelujah I Love Her So"	Ray Charles	2:48
4.	"I Believe to My Soul"	Charles, Allan Learner	3:26
5.	"Worried Life Blues"	Major Merriweather	4:13
6.	"Roberta"	Huey "Piano" Smith, Johnny Vincent	2:08

Side two
No.	Title	Writer(s)	Length
1.	"I Ain't Got You"	Calvin Carter	2:31
2.	"Bright Lights, Big City"	Jimmy Reed	2:57
3.	"Let the Good Times Roll"	Shirley Goodman	1:57
4.	"For Miss Caulker"	Eric Burdon	3:59
5.	"Road Runner"	Ellas McDaniel	2:50

== Personnel ==
The Animals

- Eric Burdon – lead vocals
- Hilton Valentine – guitar, vocals
- Alan Price – keyboards, vocals
- Chas Chandler – bass, vocals
- John Steel – drums, percussion

Technical

- Mickie Most – producer, liner notes
- Val Valentin – engineer

== Charts ==
Chart (1965)	Peak position
UK Melody Maker Top Ten LPs	8
UK New Musical Express Best Selling LPs in Britain	2
UK Record Retailer LPs Chart	6
