= Bury My Body =

Single by Joshua White and His Carolinians
- A-side: "I Don't Care Where Dey Bury My Body"
- Released: 1949
- Recorded: August 6, 1940 (New York City)
- Genre: Gospel blues
- Length: 2:58
- Label: Harmony 1006
- Songwriter: Traditional

Joshua White and His Carolinians singles chronology
""Josh and Bill Blues""	"Bury My Body"	""I Wonder Will My Mother Be on Dat Train"/"Soon in De Mornin'""

"Bury My Body" is a traditional gospel blues song. It is also known as "(Lord) I Don't Care Where Dey (They, You) Bury My Body" and "My Soul Is Gonna Live with God".

The origins of the song are obscure. The earliest recording may be by the Norfolk Jazz and Jubilee Quartets, as "Lord, I Don't Care Where They Bury My Body", in 1927–29. The various titles are taken from the chorus: "Bury my body, Lord, I don't care where; for my soul is gonna live with God".

As is common with traditional songs, the words vary between performers. The verses sometimes seem to refer to the miracle of the empty tomb; at others to the rapture; at yet others to the singer's indifference to the manner of disposal of his or her remains, as a small matter compared with salvation.

== Recordings ==
The following recordings are by artists with Wikipedia articles:

- 1937 – "I Don't Care Where You Bury My Body" by Mitchell's Christian Singers
- 1940 – "I Don't Care Where Dey Bury My Body" by Joshua White and his Carolinians
- 1954 – Lonnie Donegan, on the 45 rpm EP Decca DFE 6345. This version is sometimes erroneously credited to Chris Barber, who played on the recording as a backing musician
- 1964 – The Animals on the album The Animals
- 1965–66 – The Misunderstood
- 1970 – Al Kooper and Shuggie Otis on the album Kooper Session: Super Session, Vol. 2
- 1977 – "I Don't Care Where You Bury My Body" by Ella Jenkins on the album Songs, Rhythms and Chants for the Dance
- 1991 – Davy Graham on the album Playing In Traffic
- 2001 – The Starlite Desperation on the album Show You What a Baby Won't
- 2005 – Chris Barber on the album The Grand Reunion Concert
- 2012 – Robert Plant on the album Sensational Space Shifters (Live in London July '12)
- 2013 – The 77s on Gimme a Kickstart ... And a Phrase Or Two

== Other uses ==
=== Songs ===
The following songs are unrelated to the main subject of this article, and to each other, despite having related titles:

- 1993 – "Bury My Body" by John Lee Hooker, a blues song on the album Nothing But the Blues
- 2006 – "I Dont Care Where I Go When I Die", a grindcore song on the album of the same name by Gaza
- 2014 – "Bury My Body" by Fishboy on the album An Elephant

=== Albums ===
Bury My Body may refer to several compilation albums of songs by various artists, unrelated to the main subject of this article.

- 2006 – Bury My Body
- 2012 – Bury My Body, Vol. 1
- 2012 – Bury My Body, Vol. 2
