= Boom Boom (John Lee Hooker song) =

Blues standard

Single by John Lee Hooker

from the album Burnin'
- B-side: "Drug Store Woman"
- Released: April or May 1962
- Recorded: Chicago, October 26, 1961
- Studio: Universal
- Genre: Blues
- Length: 2:29
- Label: Vee-Jay
- Songwriter: John Lee Hooker
- Producer: Calvin Carter

"Boom Boom" is a song written by American blues singer and guitarist John Lee Hooker and first recorded in 1961. Although it became a blues standard, music critic Charles Shaar Murray calls it "the greatest pop song he ever wrote". "Boom Boom" was both an American R&B and pop chart success in 1962 and a UK top-twenty hit in 1992.

The song is one of Hooker's most identifiable and enduring songs and "among the tunes that every band on the [early 1960s UK] R&B circuit simply had to play". It has been recorded by numerous blues and other artists, including a 1965 North American hit by the Animals.

== Recording and composition ==
Prior to recording for Vee-Jay Records, John Lee Hooker was primarily a solo performer or accompanied by a second guitarist, such as early collaborators Eddie Burns or Eddie Kirkland. However, with Vee-Jay, he usually recorded with a small backing band, as heard on the singles "Dimples", "I Love You Honey", and "No Shoes". Detroit keyboardist Joe Hunter, who had previously worked with Hooker, was again enlisted for the recording session. Hunter brought with him "the cream of the Motown label's session men, later known as the Funk Brothers": bassist James Jamerson, drummer Benny Benjamin, plus guitarist Larry Veeder, tenor saxophonist Hank Cosby, and baritone saxophonist Andrew "Mike" Terry. They have been described as "just the right band" for "Boom Boom". Hooker had a unique sense of timing, which demanded "big-eared sidemen".

The original "Boom Boom" is an uptempo (168 beats per minute) blues song, which has been notated in 2/2 time in the key of F. It has been described as "about the tightest musical structure of any Hooker composition: its verses sedulously adhere to the twelve-bar format over which Hooker generally rides so roughshod". The song uses "a stop-time hook that opens up for one of the genre's most memorable guitar riffs" and incorporates a middle instrumental section Hooker-style boogie.

According to Hooker, he wrote the song during an extended engagement at the Apex Bar in Detroit.

I would never be on time [for the gig]; I always would be late comin' in. And she [the bartender Willa] kept saying, "Boom boom – you late again". Every night: "Boom, boom – you late again". I said "Hmm, that's a song!" ... I got it together, the lyrics, rehearsed it, and I played it at the place, and the people went wild.

Also included are several wordless phrases, "how-how-how-how" and "hmm-hmm-hmm-hmm". "Boom Boom" became the Hooker song that is "the most memorable, the most instantly appealing, and the one which has proved the most adaptable to the needs of other performers". ZZ Top later used similar lines ("how-how-how-how") for their popular "La Grange".

== Releases and charts ==
When "Boom Boom" was released as a single in April or May 1962, the song became a hit. It entered the Billboard Hot R&B Sides chart on June 16, 1962, where it spent eight weeks and reached number 16. The song also appeared on the Billboard Hot 100, where it peaked at number 60, making it one of only two Hooker singles to enter the broader chart. It was included on the 1962 Vee-Jay album Burnin' as well as many Hooker compilations, including John Lee Hooker: The Ultimate Collection.

Two years later, in 1964, the song made a brief appearance on the chart in Walloon Belgium, which at the time did not rank positions. In 1992, after being featured in a Lee Jeans commercial, the "Boom Boom" reached number 16 on the UK Singles Chart. It also appeared on charts in New Zealand (number 24 in 1992) and France (numbers 45 in 1993 and 87 in 2013).

Hooker recorded several later versions. Following the success of the Animals' version, Hooker re-recorded the song in 1968 for Stateside Records as the B-side of "Cry Before I Go" under the longer title "Boom Boom Boom". He reworked the song as "Bang Bang Bang Bang" for his Live at Soledad Prison album, as a South Side Chicago street musician in the film The Blues Brothers (but the song itself is not included in the film soundtrack), and as the title track for his 1992 album Boom Boom with Jimmie Vaughan.

== The Animals version ==
"Boom Boom"

Single by the Animals

from the album The Animals
- B-side: "Blue Feeling"
- Released: November 1964
- Recorded: January 1964
- Genre: Blues rock
- Length: 2:57
- Label: MGM
- Songwriter: John Lee Hooker
- Producer: Mickie Most

The Animals singles chronology
"I'm Crying" (1964)	"Boom Boom" (1964)	"Don't Let Me Be Misunderstood" (1965)

English rock band the Animals recorded "Boom Boom" for their 1964 UK debut album The Animals. Their blues-rock rendition generally follows John Lee Hooker's original, although they add "shake it baby" as a response to the "come on and shake" refrain in the middle section, taken from Hooker's "Shake It Baby" (recorded during the 1962 American Folk Blues Festival tour in Europe, where it became a hit in 1963).

The Animals' version was released as a single in North America in November 1964 and is included on the Animals' second American album, The Animals on Tour. It reached number 43 on the Billboard Hot 100 and number 14 on the Canadian RPM Top 40&5 singles chart. The song also appeared on the unranked chart in Wallonia.

Cash Box described it as "a rousing salute to the apple of a guy's eye" that's "exciting, funky-styled" and "a great swinger."

Over the years, several versions of "Boom Boom" have been recorded by various Animals reunion lineups as well as by former members Eric Burdon and Alan Price. In 2012, the original 1964 version was used in the film Skyfall.

== Big Head Todd and the Monsters version ==
American rock group Big Head Todd and the Monsters recorded "Boom Boom" with Hooker for their album Beautiful World (1997). Beginning with the television series debut of NCIS: New Orleans in 2014, a portion of Big Head Todd's version has been used as the opening theme.

== Recognition and legacy ==
In 1995, John Lee Hooker's "Boom Boom" was included in the Rock and Roll Hall of Fame's list of "The Songs That Shaped Rock and Roll". It was inducted into the Blues Foundation Hall of Fame in 2009 in the "Classics of Blues Recording" category. A Detroit Free Press poll in 2016 ranked the song at number 37 in "Detroit's 100 Greatest Songs". Rolling Stone magazine ranked Hooker's version at number 463 on its 2021 list of the "500 Greatest Songs of All Time", down from number 220 on its 2004 list.

In the Wolfenstein: The New Order, set in a world that the Nazis won the Second World War, the song is covered in German by "Ralph Becker" a fictional artist signed by "Neumond Records."
