= I've Been Around (song) =

Fats Domino song

"I've Been Around" is a song written and performed by Fats Domino, released as the B-side to the single, "Be My Guest", in 1959. While "Be My Guest" peaked at number eight on the Billboard Hot 100, "I've Been Around" made the chart on its own, peaking at number nineteen on the R&B charts and reaching number thirty-three on the Billboard Hot 100.
