= It's My Life (The Animals song) =

Single by the Animals

from the album The Best of The Animals
- B-side: "I'm Going to Change the World" (Non-album track)
- Released: 22 October 1965
- Recorded: 10 September 1965
- Genre: Rock
- Length: 3:09
- Label: Columbia (UK) MGM (US)
- Songwriters: Roger Atkins, Carl D'Errico
- Producer: Mickie Most

The Animals singles chronology
"We Gotta Get Out of This Place" (1965)	"It's My Life" (1965)	"Inside-Looking Out" (1966)

"It's My Life" is a song written by New York City songwriters Roger Atkins and Carl D'Errico. The song was originally performed by English R&B band The Animals, who released it as a single in October 1965 (see 1965 in music). Also released on two EPs that same year, the song first appeared on an album in 1966, on The Best of the Animals.

The song became a hit in several countries and has since been recorded by multiple artists.

== Animals original ==
D'Errico, who wrote the music, and Atkins, who wrote the lyrics, were professional songwriters associated with the greater Brill Building scene in New York City. By 1965 they were working for Screen Gems Music but had only found minor success at best.

"It's My Life" was written specifically for The Animals because their producer Mickie Most was soliciting material for the group's next recording sessions. (Other Animals hits to come out of this Brill Building call were "We Gotta Get Out of This Place" and "Don't Bring Me Down".) "It's My Life" has become D'Errico and Atkins' best-known work.

The Animals' recording is propelled by a bass guitar riff from Chas Chandler, soon joined by an electric twelve-string guitar riff from Hilton Valentine. In the view of musicologist Walter Everett, the doubled line gives the song its strength. The organ part by Dave Rowberry (Alan Price's replacement) gives the track the sound that distinguishes the Animals from other "British Invasion" groups, its darker timbre differing from Mike Smith of the Dave Clark Five, for example. Music writer Dave Marsh has compared the dual part to a rock version of pointillism. James E. Perrone feels the low-pitched, gruff vocal of lead singer Eric Burdon matches lyrics that rhetorically convey Burdon's working class origins in Tyneside, North East England:

It's a hard world to get a break in
All the good things have been taken
But girl there are ways to make certain things pay
Though I'm dressed in these rags
I'll wear sable some day

The song then builds to a musical climax in the chorus, with Burdon complemented by response vocals from Chandler and Rowberry:

But baby! (Baby!) Remember! (Remember!)
It's my life and I'll do what I want
It's my mind and I'll think what I want

Songwriter Roger Atkins has said that the lyrics he wrote contained the line "Sure I'll do wrong, hurt you some time...", but that Burdon recorded the wrong words: "Show me I'm wrong, hurt me sometime...". Atkins said that Burdon's words "never made any sense to me. Everyone who's recorded it sings the wrong chorus, and sometimes even the wrong lyrics in the verses, too."

There are two versions of the Animals' recording due to a slight variation of playback speed. The track found on The Best Of The Animals 1987 CD compilation, clocking in at 3:13, is pitched a half-step lower than the one included on the Retrospective CD from 2004, which is trimmed down to 3:08 due to its faster speed. Other than that slight speed/pitch variation and an additional 3 seconds or so of fade-out music on the faster version, the two tracks are exactly the same.

"It's My Life" was visually premiered on the US television show Hullabaloo in autumn 1965, where the group sang live vocals against canned music on a den-type set that featured attractive young women sticking their heads through holes in the wall, where normally animal heads would be mounted.

In Marsh's view, "It's My Life" was one of a wave of songs in 1965, by artists such as the Beatles, the Rolling Stones, and Bob Dylan, that ushered in a new role for rock music as a vehicle for common perception and as a force for social consciousness. Writer Craig Werner sees the song as reflecting the desire on the part of both the Animals and their audience to define themselves apart from the community they came from. Writer Dave Thompson includes the song in his book 1000 Songs that Rock Your World, saying simply, "There is no angrier declaration of independence than this." Billboard said of the song that "offbeat lyric and slow driving dance beat proves a top of the chart contender."

Cash Box described it as a "twangy, low-down blues-drenched ode all about a real independent type of fella who does just as he pleases."

=== Charts ===
Chart (1965–66)	Peak position
Canadian Singles Chart	2
Finland (Soumen Virallinen)	28
Ireland (IRMA)	9
New Zealand (Lever Hit Parade)	6
Norway (VG-lista)	5
South Africa (Springbok)	11
UK Singles (Official Charts)	7
U.S. Billboard Hot 100	23
U.S. Cash Box Top 100	20

== Later versions ==
During the mid-1970s Bruce Springsteen began performing "It's My Life" during his Born to Run tours. It was preceded by the first iteration of Springsteen's spoken narratives – characterized by music writer Robert Hilburn as "painfully intense" – about how he and his father never got along about anything (that would later manifest themselves in introductions to Springsteen's own songs "Independence Day" and "The River"). The tempo of the song itself was greatly slowed down, to the point where it bore little obvious resemblance to the Animals' original, and renditions could easily run over ten minutes overall in duration; lyrics were varied somewhat across almost every performance. A live version of Springsteen's version was released in early 2015 as part of his 'Archives' series.

In 1977, The Police used to play a version of "It's My Life" in concert when Henri Padovani was the guitarist and as a four-piece unit with Andy Summers.

In 1980, Shaun Cassidy covered "It's My Life" on his Todd Rundgren-produced LP Wasp.

The song next cropped up as the closing part of ex-New York Dolls singer David Johansen's Animals medley from his 1982 live album Live It Up. It attracted album oriented rock airplay and considerable MTV video play at the time.

In 1986 American hard rock band Alcatrazz recorded the song on the album Dangerous Games. It failed to chart.

In 1989, the New York hardcore band Madball released a freely inspired, one-minute-long rendition of this song, which became one of their anthems. It can be found in their debut EP Ball of Destruction and album Droppin' Many Suckers.

In 1992, Bon Jovi performed their own Animals medley for an MTV show later released on video as Keep the Faith: An Evening with Bon Jovi; they led off with "It's My Life". In 1995, they performed the medley live with Eric Burdon. (Note however that Bon Jovi's 2000 hit "It's My Life" is a different song.)

In 1997, during a scene in Central Park in Disney's Jungle 2 Jungle, Tim Allen and Sam Huntington dance to a version sung by Dana Hutson of the group Pele Juju.

Burdon performed the song live with Roseanne Barr on her The Roseanne Show in 2000.

In 2025, the "Official Trailer 2" of the movie, "Mickey 17" used instrumental excerpts from the song.
