= Baby Let Me Take You Home =

Single by The Animals

from the album The Animals
- B-side: "Gonna Send You Back to Walker"
- Released: March 1964 (UK), August 1964 (USA)
- Recorded: 12 February 1964
- Genre: Rock
- Length: 2:19
- Label: Columbia (EMI) (UK); MGM Records (USA)
- Songwriter(s): Wes Farrell; Bert Russell
- Producer(s): Mickie Most

The Animals singles chronology
"Baby Let Me Take You Home" (1964)	"The House of the Rising Sun" (1964)

"Baby Let Me Take You Home", a song credited to Bert Russell (a.k.a. Bert Berns) and Wes Farrell, was The Animals' debut single, released in 1964. In the UK, it reached #21 on the pop singles chart. In the U.S. its B-side, "Gonna Send You Back to Walker" (retitled "to Georgia"), was released but did not chart. American soul singer Hoagy Lands previously recorded the song in 1964 as "Baby Let Me Hold Your Hand", released on Atlantic 2217.

The song is an arrangement of Eric Von Schmidt's rendering of "Baby, Let Me Follow You Down" as covered by Bob Dylan, on his first, self-titled, album. The Animals' version opens with striking unaccompanied guitar arpeggios, inserts a middle section with spoken words over an organ riff, and closes with a frantic double-time coda. The result was a key influence on Dylan's change to electric music and to the folk-rock genre.

In 2006, Eric Burdon, of The Animals, began to perform the song in a heavier version, on his concerts again, adding a short story how they came to it.
