= Big Maceo Merriweather =

American pianist and blues singer (1905–1953)

Background information
- Born: Major Merriweather; March 31, 1905; Newnan, Georgia, U.S.
- Died: February 23, 1953 (aged 47) Chicago, Illinois, U.S.
- Genres: Chicago blues
- Occupation: Musician
- Instruments: Piano; vocals
- Years active: 1920s–1952
- Labels: Bluebird; RCA

Major "Big Maceo" Merriweather (March 31, 1905 – February 23, 1953) was an American pianist and blues singer. He was mainly active in Chicago through the 1940s.

== Career ==
Born in Newnan, Georgia, Merriweather was a self-taught pianist. In the 1920s, he moved to Detroit, Michigan, to begin his music career. He moved to Chicago in 1941, where he made the acquaintance of Tampa Red. Red introduced him to Lester Melrose of RCA Victor and its subsidiary label Bluebird Records, which signed Merriweather to a recording contract.

His first record was "Worried Life Blues" (1941), which became a blues hit, a blues standard, and remained his signature piece. The song had elements derived from Sleepy John Estes' "Someday, Baby". Other classic piano blues recordings followed, such as "Chicago Breakdown", "Texas Stomp", and "Detroit Jump". His piano style was developed from players including Leroy Carr and Roosevelt Sykes and from the boogie-woogie style of Meade Lux Lewis and Albert Ammons. He in turn influenced other musicians, such as Little Johnny Jones and Henry Gray, the latter of whom credited Merriweather with helping him launch his career as a blues pianist.

His style influenced practically every postwar blues pianist of significance. His best known song, "Worried Life Blues", is a staple of the blues repertoire, with artists such as Eric Clapton performing it regularly in concert. It was in the first batch of songs inducted into the Blues Hall of Fame in the category Classic Blues Recordings – Singles or Album Tracks, alongside "Stormy Monday", 'Sweet Home Chicago", "Dust My Broom", and "Hellhound on My Trail".

Merriweather suffered a stroke in 1946. He died of a heart attack on February 23, 1953, in Chicago and is interred at the Detroit Memorial Cemetery, in Warren, Michigan.

His recordings for RCA Victor/Bluebird were released as a double album, Chicago Breakdown, in 1975. They have since been reissued on various labels.

In 2002, Merriweather was posthumously inducted into the Blues Hall of Fame.

On May 3, 2008, the White Lake Blues Festival took place at the Howmet Playhouse Theater, in Whitehall, Michigan. The event was organized by executive producer Steve Salter of the nonprofit organization Killer Blues to raise funds to honor Merriweather's unmarked grave with a headstone. The concert was a success, and a headstone was placed in June 2008.

== Discography ==
- Collection "Jazz Classics" No. 22 (RCA Victor, 1961)
- Black & White Vol. 9 (RCA, 1969)
- Big Maceo with Tampa Red in Chicago 1941–1946 (Sunflower, 1970)
- Chicago Breakdown (RCA, 1975)
- Bluebird No. 2: Big Maceo, vol. 1 (RCA, 1976)
- The Best of Big Maceo, vols. 1 and 2 (Arhoolie, 1984)
- Tampa Red/Big Maceo: Get It Cats! (Swingtime, 1989)
- The King of Chicago Blues Piano (Arhoolie, 1993)
- Worried Life Blues (Orbis, 1995)
- The Bluebird Recordings (RCA/Bluebird 1997)
- The Essential Recordings of Tampa Red and Big Maceo (Indigo, 1999)
- The Best of Big Maceo with Tampa Red (Blues Forever, 2001)
- Chicago Piano, vols. 1 and 2 (Fabulous, 2003)
- Complete Recorded Works in Chronological Order Volume, vols 1 and 2 (Document, 2004)

== See also ==
- List of blues musicians
- List of boogie woogie musicians
- List of Chicago blues musicians
- Music of Detroit
