= The Genius Sings the Blues =

Compilation album by Ray Charles
- Released: October 1961
- Recorded: 1952–1960
- Genres: Rhythm and blues, piano blues, soul
- Length: 34:19
- Labels: Atlantic; SD-8052
- Producers: Ahmet Ertegün, Jerry Wexler

Ray Charles chronology
| Ray Charles and Betty Carter (1961) | The Genius Sings the Blues (1961) | Modern Sounds in Country and Western Music (1962) |

Singles from The Genius Sings the Blues
- 1. "Feelin' Sad" Released: 1956; 2. "(Night Time Is) The Right Time" Released: 1959; 3. "I'm Movin' On / I Believe to My Soul" Released: 1959; 4. "Early in the Mornin'" Released: 1961; 5. "Feelin' Sad" Released: 1963

Professional ratings
Review scores
| Source | Rating |
|---|---|
| AllMusic | 4.5/5 stars |
| Blender | 5/5 stars |
| The Penguin Guide to Blues Recordings | 2.5/4 stars |
| The Rolling Stone Album Guide | 4/5 stars |

The Genius Sings the Blues is an album by Ray Charles, released in October 1961 on Atlantic Records. The album was his last release for Atlantic, compiling twelve blues songs from various sessions during his tenure for the label. The album showcases Charles's stylistic development with a combination of piano blues, jazz, and southern R&B. The photo for the album cover was taken by renowned photographer Lee Friedlander. The Genius Sings the Blues was reissued in 2003 by Rhino Entertainment with liner notes by Billy Taylor.

== Background ==
Hailing from Greenville, Florida, Ray Charles assimilated much of the Southern black man's musical heritage with its various blues stories, folk songs, and gospel revelations. Charles studied music at a school for blind children in St. Augustine and developed a characteristic modern jazz style of playing and writing by listening to Art Tatum, Nat "King" Cole, Bud Powell, Oscar Peterson, and other contemporaries who played in the styles fashionable around the time Charles moved to Seattle. He molded many disparate musical elements into a style with unique harmony and traditional rhythmic patterns.

== Music ==
Jazz composer Billy Taylor further discussed Charles' innovative music and his reaction to hearing it:

While playing through some new music for a projected Ruth Brown record date, I was asked to listen to an original song played and sung by a young composer and pianist from Seattle, Washington. I can still remember how surprised I was to hear this kind of music from a Northwesterner. He reminded me of Charles Brown, another pianist-singer who was very popular in the Forties, but he had a very personal sound and there was something different about his rhythmic approach. In his handling of melody he seemed to be using devices similar to those used by Dinah Washington and a small group of popular singers who allowed their gospel singing backgrounds to influence their interpretation of popular songs... I was intrigued by the emotional quality projected by both his piano playing and his unusual voice and was not surprised when Ahmet Ertegün said that he wanted to let the young musician record some of his own material. "He communicates just like the old blues singers", Ahmet said.

The innovation of Ray Charles is presented on this compilation LP. The Blues finds Charles delivering wailing and emotional numbers ("Hard Times", "Night Time Is the Right Time") to uptempo arrangements of country blues ("I'm Movin' On", "Early in the Mornin'"). Covering ground from his first session for Atlantic ("The Midnight Hour") to his last ("I Believe to My Soul"), The Genius Sings the Blues began as a simple cash-in LP after Charles' split from Atlantic Records and ended up as one of Charles' most well-known compilations.

== Track listing ==
All songs written by Ray Charles, except where noted.

Side one

1. "Early in the Mornin'" (Dallas Bartley, Leo Hickman, Louis Jordan) – 2:48
2. "Hard Times (No One Knows Better Than I)" – 2:56
3. "The Midnight Hour" (Sam Sweet) – 3:02
4. "(Night Time Is) The Right Time" (Napoleon Brown, Ozzie Cadena, Lew Herman) – 3:25
5. "Feelin' Sad" (Guitar Slim) – 2:50
6. "Ray's Blues" – 2:55

Side two

1. "I'm Movin' On" (Hank Snow) – 2:13
2. "I Believe to My Soul" – 3:01
3. "Nobody Cares" – 2:41
4. "Mr. Charles' Blues" – 2:48
5. "Some Day Baby" – 3:01
6. "I Wonder Who" – 2:46

== Personnel ==
Recording notes from the WaxTime 771777 Jazz Classics vinyl LP reissue of 2012.

- Ray Charles – vocals, organ, piano
- Side 1, Track 1 - Marcus Belgrave, John Hunt (trumpet) David Newman (tenor saxophone) Bennie Crawford (baritone saxophone) Ray Charles (piano, Wurlitzer, vocals) Edgar Willis (bass) Teagle Fleming (drums). Recorded NYC, October 28, 1958
- Side 1, Track 2 - Joe Bridgewater, Riley Webb (trumpet) David Newman (alto, baritone saxophone) Don Wilkerson (tenor saxophone) Ray Charles (piano, vocals) Roosevelt Sheffield (bass) William Peeples (drums). Recorded Miami, FL, April 23, 1955
- Side 1, Track 4 - Marcus Belgrave, John Hunt (trumpet) David Newman (tenor saxophone) Bennie Crawford (baritone saxophone) Ray Charles (piano, Wurlitzer, vocals) Edgar Willis (bass) Teagle Fleming (drums). Recorded NYC, October 28, 1958

== Chart history ==
Album

| Year | Chart | Peak position |
|---|---|---|
| 1962 | U.S. Pop Albums chart | 73 |
