= I'm Crying =

Single by The Animals

from the album The Animals on Tour
- B-side: "Take It Easy"
- Released: September 1964
- Recorded: 31 July 1964
- Genre: Rhythm and blues, rock
- Length: 2:49
- Label: Columbia
- Songwriters: Eric Burdon, Alan Price
- Producer: Mickie Most

The Animals singles chronology
"The House of the Rising Sun" (1964)	"I'm Crying" (1964)	"Boom Boom" (1964)

"I'm Crying" is a song originally performed by the English rock/R&B band The Animals. Written by the group's lead vocalist Eric Burdon and organist Alan Price, it was their first original composition released as a single. The song was released in September 1964 and became their second transatlantic hit after "The House of the Rising Sun", which was released earlier in the year (see 1964 in music). The single became a Top 20 hit in Canada, the United Kingdom, and the United States.

== Reception and charts ==
Cash Box described it as "a pulsating lament that the crew pounds out in electrifying fashion" and "a powerful r&b-styled instrumental showcase."

Even when the single became a hit, it was nowhere near the hit that "The House of the Rising Sun" was, so songs written by members of the band were kept as b-sides until the band changed record producers from Mickie Most to Tom Wilson in 1966.

Chart (1964)	Peak position
Canadian Singles Chart	6
UK Singles (OCC)	8
US Billboard Hot 100	19

== Personnel ==
- Eric Burdon – lead and backing vocals
- Chas Chandler – bass guitar, backing vocals
- Hilton Valentine – guitar, backing vocals
- Alan Price – keyboards
- John Steel – drums

== Cover versions ==
There are many covers of it, including:

- Eric Burdon
- Iggy Pop
- Mondo Topless
- Paul Revere & the Raiders
- The Pretty Things
- The Secret Service
- Bobby Sherman
- SRC
- Tom Petty and the Heartbreakers
- The Doughboys (2007)
- Dead Brothers (de), as Crying
