= Worried Life Blues =

Blues standard

Single by Big Maceo
- A-side: "Texas Blues"
- Released: 1941
- Recorded: Chicago, June 24, 1941
- Genre: Blues
- Length: 2:51
- Label: Bluebird
- Songwriter(s): Maceo Merriweather a.k.a. Big Maceo
- Producer(s): Lester Melrose

Big Maceo singles chronology
"Worried Life Blues" (1941)	"It's All Up To You" (1941)

"Worried Life Blues" is a blues standard and one of the most recorded blues songs of all time. Originally recorded by Big Maceo Merriweather in 1941, "Worried Life Blues" was an early blues hit and Maceo's most recognized song. The song was inspired by an earlier track and several artists have had record chart successes with their interpretations of the song.

== Background ==
"Worried Life Blues" is based on "Someday Baby Blues" recorded by Sleepy John Estes in 1935. Estes' song is performed as a vocal and guitar country blues, whereas Maceo's is a prototypical Chicago blues. The two original songs have lyrical differences, such as in the first few verses:

"Worried Life Blues" by Big Maceo (1941):
Oh lordy lord, oh lordy lord
It hurts me so bad, for us to part
But someday baby, I ain't gonna worry my life anymore

"Someday Baby Blues" by Sleepy John Estes (1935):
I don't care how long you go, I don't care how long you stay
But that good kind treatment, bring you back home someday
Someday baby, you ain't gonna worry my mind anymore

Over the years the differences have become blurred by various cover versions of the songs, which use elements from both songs, often combined with new lyrics and variations in the music.

== Composition and recording ==
Big Maceo recorded "Worried Life Blues" June 24, 1941, shortly after arriving in Chicago. Lester Melrose produced the song and it became Maceo's first single on Bluebird Records. The song is a moderate-tempo eight-bar blues, with Maceo on vocal and piano, accompanied by frequent collaborator, guitarist and fellow recording artist, Tampa Red and bassist Ransom Knowling.

Music writer Keith Shadwick identifies it a major hit and blues historian Jim O'Neal notes that it "eclipsed the song ['Someday Baby'] that inspired it". (Note: Both "Someday Baby" and "Worried Life" were released before Billboard or a similar service began tracking such releases.) Several other renditions soon followed, including those by Bill Gaither (1941), Sonny Boy Williams (1942), and Honeyboy Edwards (1942). In 1945, Maceo recorded a second version with additional lyrics, also accompanied by Tampa Red. Titled "Things Have Changed", it reached number four on Billboard magazine's Race Records chart.

== Recognition and influence ==
"Worried Life Blues" became an early blues standard and was among the first songs inducted into the Blues Foundation Hall of Fame in 1983 as a "Classic of Blues Recordings". In 2006, the song received a Grammy Hall of Fame Award. Over the years numerous artists have covered "Worried Life Blues" or some mixture of it, "Someday Baby Blues", and other elements, making it one of the most recorded blues songs of all time. When Charles Brown reworked it as a West Coast blues number titled "Trouble Blues", it was one of the biggest hits of 1949 and spent 15 weeks at number one on Billboard's Race Records/Rhythm & Blues Records chart. In 1955, Muddy Waters' recording of it as "Trouble No More" in a Chicago blues style reached number seven on the R&B chart. Junior Parker recorded "Worried Life" in 1969; Minit Records released it as a single, which appeared at number 34. In 1970, a version originally recorded by B.B. King as "Someday Baby" in 1960 was retitled "Worried Life" and reached number 48. (Note: B.B. King also recorded it in 1970 as "Ain't Gonna Worry My Life Anymore" for Indianola Mississippi Seeds and in 2000 with Eric Clapton for Riding with the King.)

== Bibliography ==
- Dahl, Bill (1996). "Big Maxeo Merriweather". In Erlewine, Michael; Bogdanov, Vladimir; Woodstra, Chris; Koda, Cub (eds.). All Music Guide to the Blues. San Francisco: Miller Freeman Books. ISBN 0-87930-424-3.
- Herzhaft, Gerard (1992). "Someday Baby". Encyclopedia of the Blues. Fayetteville, Arkansas: University of Arkansas Press. ISBN 1-55728-252-8.
- Shadwick, Keith (2007). "Big Maceo: Blues Piano". The Encyclopedia of Jazz & Blues. London: Quantum. ISBN 978-0-681-08644-9.
- Whitburn, Joel (1988). Top R&B Singles 1942–1988. Menomonee Falls, Wisconsin: Record Research. ISBN 0-89820-068-7.
