= Sol Marcus =

American songwriter and pianist (1912-1976)

Sol Marcus (October 1, 1912 – February 5, 1976) was an American songwriter and pianist.

Born in New York City, he began working as a songwriter with Bennie Benjamin and Eddie Seiler (1911–1952) in the mid-1930s. He had his first writing successes with "I Don't Want to Set the World on Fire" (1941), co-written with Benjamin, Seiler, and Eddie Durham, and "When the Lights Go On Again (All Over the World)" (1942), co-written with Benjamin and Seiler. Later in the 1940s, he had further success with "Till Then" (1945), a hit for The Mills Brothers co-written with Seiler and Guy Wood; and "Ask Anyone Who Knows", written with Seiler and Al Kaufman for The Ink Spots.

He re-established a writing partnership with Bennie Benjamin in the mid-1950s. They wrote "Fabulous Character" for Sarah Vaughan, and "Lonely Man" for Elvis Presley. In 1964, Marcus and Benjamin wrote "Don't Let Me Be Misunderstood" with Horace Ott, whose songwriting credit was taken by his wife Gloria Caldwell because Ott, as a BMI member, was not permitted to work with ASCAP members such as Marcus and Benjamin. The song was first recorded by Nina Simone, and was later a hit for The Animals, Santa Esmeralda, and Elvis Costello.

Marcus died in 1976 in Linden, New Jersey.
