= Don't Let Me Be Misunderstood =

1964 single by Nina Simone

Single by Nina Simone

from the album Broadway-Blues-Ballads
- B-side: "A Monster"
- Released: October 1964
- Recorded: New York City
- Genre: Blues; jazz
- Length: 2:48
- Label: Philips
- Songwriters: Bennie Benjamin; Horace Ott; Sol Marcus

"Don't Let Me Be Misunderstood" is a song written by Bennie Benjamin, Horace Ott and Sol Marcus for American singer-songwriter and pianist Nina Simone, who recorded the first version in 1964 for her album Broadway-Blues-Ballads. "Don't Let Me Be Misunderstood" has been covered by many artists. Two of the covers were transatlantic hits, the first in 1965 by the Animals on their album Animal Tracks, which was a blues rock version; and in 1977 by the disco group Santa Esmeralda on their album Don't Let Me Be Misunderstood, which was a four-on-the-floor rearrangement. A 1986 cover by Elvis Costello found success in Britain and Ireland.

== Nina Simone original ==
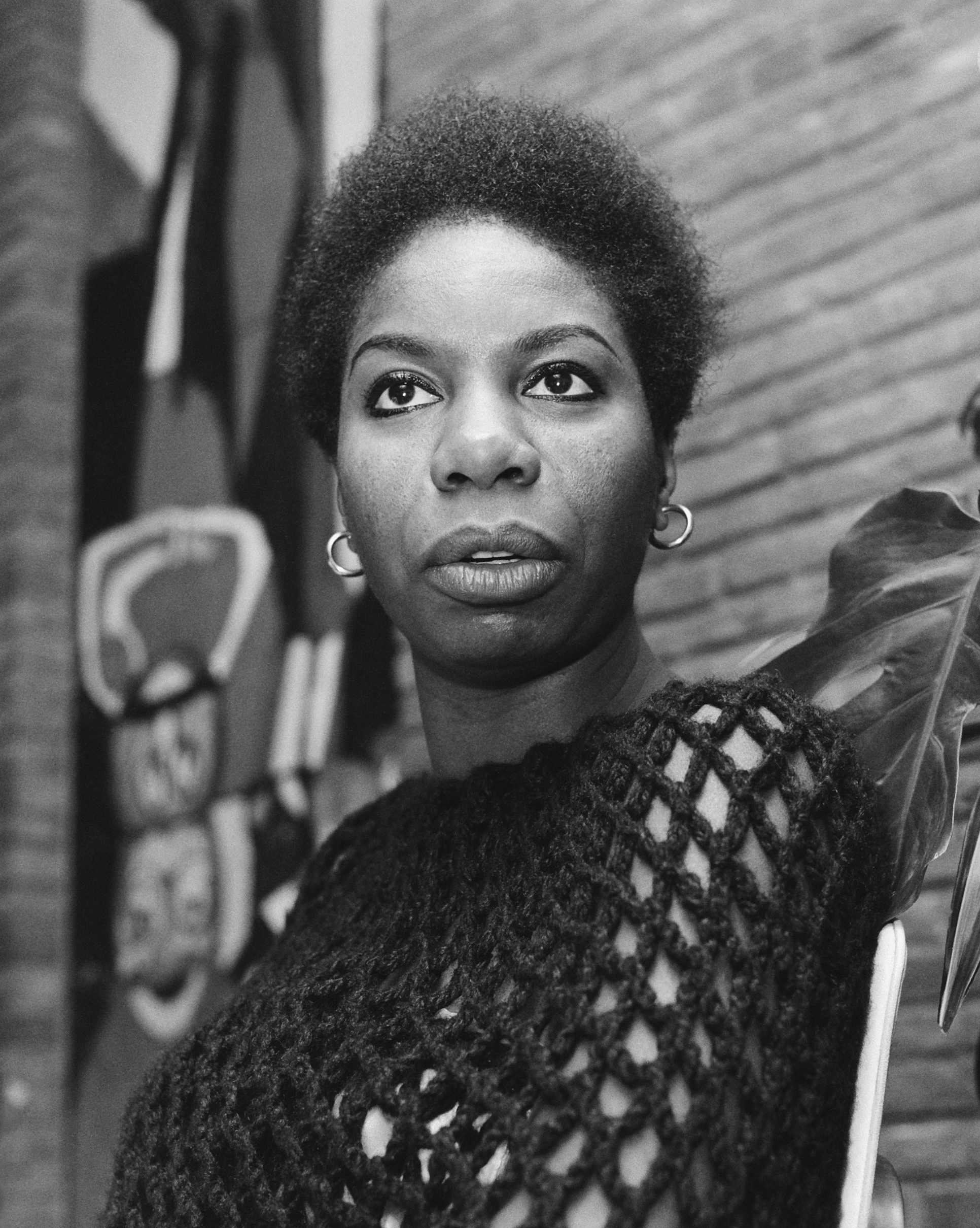
Nina Simone (portrait, 1965) recorded the first version of "Don't Let Me Be Misunderstood"

Composer and arranger Horace Ott came up with the melody and chorus lyrics after a temporary falling out with his girlfriend (and wife-to-be), Gloria Caldwell. Ott then brought it to writing partners Bennie Benjamin and Sol Marcus to complete. Since rules of the time prevented BMI writers (Ott) from officially collaborating with ASCAP members (Benjamin and Marcus), Ott listed Caldwell's name instead of his own in the songwriting credits.

"Don't Let Me Be Misunderstood" was one of five songs written by Benjamin and Marcus and presented for Nina Simone's 1964 album Broadway-Blues-Ballads. There, the song was taken at a very slow tempo and arranged around the harp and other orchestral elements including a backing choir that appears at several points. Simone sings it in her typically difficult-to-categorize style.

To some writers, this version of "Don't Let Me Be Misunderstood" carried the subtext of the Civil Rights Movement that concerned much of Simone's work of the time; while to others this was more personal, and was the song, and phrase, that best exemplified Simone's career and life.

== The Animals version ==
"Don't Let Me Be Misunderstood"
- Side A of the original UK single

Single by the Animals

from the album Animal Tracks
- B-side: "Club a Go-Go"
- Released: January 29, 1965 (U.K.); February 1965 (U.S.)
- Recorded: November 16, 1964
- Genre: Blues rock
- Length: 2:28
- Label: Columbia Graphophone (UK); MGM (US)
- Songwriters: Bennie Benjamin; Horace Ott; Sol Marcus
- Producer: Mickie Most

The Animals singles chronology
| "Boom Boom" (1964) | "Don't Let Me Be Misunderstood" (1965) | "Bring It On Home to Me" (1965) |

The Animals' lead singer Eric Burdon would later say of the song, "It was never considered pop material, but it somehow got passed on to us and we fell in love with it immediately."

The song was recorded in November 1964. The band became a trans-Atlantic hit in early 1965 for their rendition of the song, rising to No. 3 on the UK Singles Chart, No. 15 on the U.S. pop singles chart, and No. 4 in Canada.

Cash Box described it as "a striking combination of R&B and English-rock touches." This single was ranked by Rolling Stone at No. 322 on their list of the 500 Greatest Songs of All Time.

During Animals concerts at the time, the group maintained the recorded arrangement, but Burdon sometimes slowed the vocal line down to an almost spoken part, recapturing a bit of the Simone flavor.

At the South by Southwest festival in 2012, Bruce Springsteen credited the song as the inspiration and the riff for his 1978 song "Badlands".

Chart Performance

| Chart (1965) | Peak position |
|---|---|
| Australia (Kent Music Report) | 29 |
| Canada RPM Top Singles | 4 |
| Finland (Suomen virallinen lista) | 25 |
| France (IFOP) | 9 |
| Ireland (IRMA) | 7 |
| Netherlands | 26 |
| Sweden | 7 |
| UK | 3 |
| US Billboard Hot 100 | 15 |
| US Cash Box Top 100 | 17 |

=== Year-end charts ===
| Chart (1965) | Rank |
|---|---|
| UK | 67 |
| US (Joel Whitburn's Pop Annual) | 157 |

== Santa Esmeralda version ==
"Don't Let Me Be Misunderstood"

Single by Santa Esmeralda

from the album Don't Let Me Be Misunderstood
- A-side: "You're My Everything"
- Released: December 1977
- Recorded: 1977
- Genre: Disco; flamenco
- Length: 16:12 (original album version)
- Label: Casablanca
- Songwriters: Bennie Benjamin; Horace Ott; Sol Marcus
- Producers: Nicolas Skorsky; Jean Manuel de Scarano

A disco version of the song by the group Santa Esmeralda, which took the Animals' arrangement and transformed it with disco, flamenco, and other Latin rhythm and ornamentation elements, also became a hit in the late 1970s. Their version of the song was first released in summer 1977 as a 16-minute epic that took up an entire side of their Don't Let Me Be Misunderstood album, which was picked up for greater worldwide distribution by their label at the time, Casablanca Records. The 12-inch club remix was extremely popular, reached No. 1 on the U.S. Billboard Club Play Singles chart and in some European countries as well. Though, the single peaked at No. 4 on the Hot Dance/Disco-Club Play chart. Their 7-inch single version peaked at #15 on the Billboard Hot 100 in the U.S., which is coincidentally the same number at which The Animals version peaked.

Instrumental sections of this version were used in the pilot for the US game show Bullseye, live telecasts of the PBA Tour on USA Network from 1982 to 1984, and in the 2003 Quentin Tarantino film Kill Bill: Volume I, in the background during the final duel between The Bride (Uma Thurman) and O-Ren Ishii (Lucy Liu).

=== Charts ===
==== Weekly charts ====
Santa Esmeralda

| Chart (1977–1978) | Peak position |
|---|---|
| Australia (Kent Music Report) | 7 |
| Canada RPM Top Singles | 10 |
| France (IFOP) | 2 |
| Italy | 1 |
| New Zealand (RIANZ) | 8 |
| South Africa (Springbok) | 9 |
| UK | 41 |
| US Billboard Hot 100 | 15 |
| US Cash Box Top 100 | 14 |
| West Germany | 1 |

==== Year-end charts ====
Year-end chart performance for "Don't Let Me Be Misunderstood"
| Chart (1978) | Position |
|---|---|
| Australia (Kent Music Report) | 67 |

=== Certifications ===
| Region | Certification | Certified units/sales |
|---|---|---|
| France (SNEP) | Gold | 500,000^{*} |
^{*} Sales figures based on certification alone.

== Elvis Costello version ==
"Don't Let Me Be Misunderstood"

Single by Elvis Costello

from the album King of America
- Released: January 1986
- Recorded: Ocean Way, Sunset Sound, & Sound Factory Studio, Los Angeles, 1985–86
- Genre: Roots rock; folk rock
- Label: F-Beat (UK); Columbia (US)
- Songwriters: Bennie Benjamin; Horace Ott; Sol Marcus
- Producer: T Bone Burnett

Elvis Costello singles chronology
| "Green Shirt" (1985) | "Don't Let Me Be Misunderstood" (1986) | "Lovable" (1986) |

British new wave musician Elvis Costello, under the label "The Costello Show", covered "Don't Let Me Be Misunderstood" for his 1986 album, King of America. The song was a late addition to the album; Costello had originally intended to record "I Hope You're Happy Now", but throat problems during the final sessions prevented him from doing so. Costello recalled,

Rather than scrap the session we cut a slow, violent version of the Animals/Nina Simone song: "Don't Let Me Be Misunderstood". The next day we borrowed Michael Blair from Tom Waits' band to add a marimba part, and the record was complete. This may seem ironic as I attacked the song with a vocal capacity that Tom might have rejected as being too hoarse.

Against Costello's wishes, his American record company, Columbia, insisted on releasing the song as the first single from King of America. The single reached No. 33 in the UK and No. 22 on the Irish Singles Chart, but did not chart in the US. He explained, "My US record company, Columbia, showed their customary imagination in releasing the safe 'cover' song as a single ahead of any of the more unusual and heartfelt balladry I had composed. 'Don't Let Me Be Misunderstood' made little impression, and my mounting debt to the company seemed to make them unwilling to risk any further effort on my behalf".

Martin Chilton of The Telegraph ranked the song as Costello's 26th best song out of 40, stating that Costello "sings it really well".

Elvis Costello (The Costello Show)

| Chart (1986) | Peak position |
|---|---|
| Ireland (IRMA) | 22 |
| UK | 33 |

== Other versions ==
Stereogum reviewed cover versions of the song in 2015, including renditions by Joe Cocker, Yusuf Islam, and Lana Del Rey. A version by Cocker for his 1969 With a Little Help from My Friends album is "a thoroughly '60s rock reading, [...] even if it dispenses with the organ intro the Animals introduced into the equation, it does have a big organ solo section and that crying blues guitar intro". Cat Stevens converted to Islam and changed his name to Yusuf Islam; when he returned to popular music, he recorded an allusion to controversies in his life by way of "Don't Let Me Be Misunderstood", as featured on his 2006 album An Other Cup. Del Rey created a "burnt-out Pop Art take on Americana" version of the song for her 2015 album Honeymoon.

=== Chart performance ===
Joe Cocker

| Chart (1996) | Peak position |
|---|---|
| UK | 53 |

Ginette Reno

| Chart (1969) | Peak position |
|---|---|
| Canada RPM Adult Contemporary | 11 |
| Canada RPM Top Singles | 53 |
