= Dimples (song) =

1956 song by John Lee Hooker

Single by John Lee Hooker
- B-side: "Baby Lee"
- Released: August 1956
- Recorded: Chicago, March 1956
- Genre: Blues
- Length: 2:09
- Label: Vee-Jay
- Songwriters: John Lee Hooker, James Bracken

John Lee Hooker singles chronology
"Every Night" (1956)	"Dimples" (1956)	"I'm So Worried Baby" (1957)

"Dimples" is a song written and recorded by blues singer-songwriter John Lee Hooker in 1956. It is an ensemble piece, with Hooker accompanied by Jimmy Reed's backup band. Eight years after its first release, it became Hooker's first record to appear in the British record charts. Called a "genuine Hooker classic" by music critic Bill Dahl, it is one of his best-known songs, with interpretations by several artists.

== Recording and composition ==
"Dimples" was one of the first songs recorded by John Lee Hooker for Vee-Jay Records. Unlike his previous record labels, Vee-Jay producers saw Hooker as a Jimmy Reed-style performer and in fact provided him with Reed's backup band for two recording sessions in 1955 and 1956. However, when the recording commenced, it became apparent that Hooker's sense of rhythm and timing was uniquely his. The backing musicians – guitarist Eddie Taylor, bassist George Washington, and drummer Tom Whitehead – adapted to his style and by the time "Dimples" was recorded they became "adept at anticipating his capricious moves".

According to music historian Ted Gioia, "Dimples" is a moderate-tempo blues that "sounds like a twelve-bar blues with a few beats amputated ... imparting a lopsided feeling ... [that] was precisely the 'hook' that gave the song its odd appeal". Hooker has given at least two different accounts about what inspired the lyrics: in one, he claimed to have written the song about a friend's wife and another where the subject is his own girlfriend. Music critic Charles Shaar Murray commented that although "Dimples" just "skimmed the lower reaches of the R&B charts and nudged its way into the pop listings ... it's about as close to pop perfection in two minutes and nine seconds as any '50s bluesman ever got".

== Releases and charts ==
Eight years after its initial release, "Dimples" was issued in the UK in 1964, where it reached number 23 on the singles chart. In 1970, John Lee Hooker recorded "Dimples" with slightly different lyrics as "I Got My Eyes on You" with Canned Heat for the album Hooker 'n Heat (in 1966, Canned Heat recorded a demo of "Dimples" that was later released on Vintage). During the sessions for Hooker's Boom Boom and Chill Out albums in 1992 and 1995, two attempts at recording "Dimples" with guest performers were made, but were not released. However, a version with Los Lobos was recorded and released on Hooker's 1997 Grammy Award-winning album Don't Look Back.

== Reviews ==
In a song review for AllMusic, Richie Unterberger described the song as "one of John Lee Hooker's most famous recordings, and certainly one of the best he did in his early career with electric full-band accompaniment". He also noted:

"Dimples" proved to be a great favorite among subsequent blues-rock bands as a choice of cover material. The Animals did a fine version in which Eric Burdon put more passion into the lyric than Hooker did on his characteristically nonchalant vocal line on the original. The Spencer Davis Group made it their first single in 1964, upping the tempo, adding harmonica, and boasting a quite exuberant vocal by a teenage Stevie Winwood. Back on this side of the Atlantic where the song had originated, the Allman Brothers Band (featuring guitarist Duane Allman's only lead vocal) did it in the 1970s.
