= John Steel (drummer) =

English drummer (born 1941)

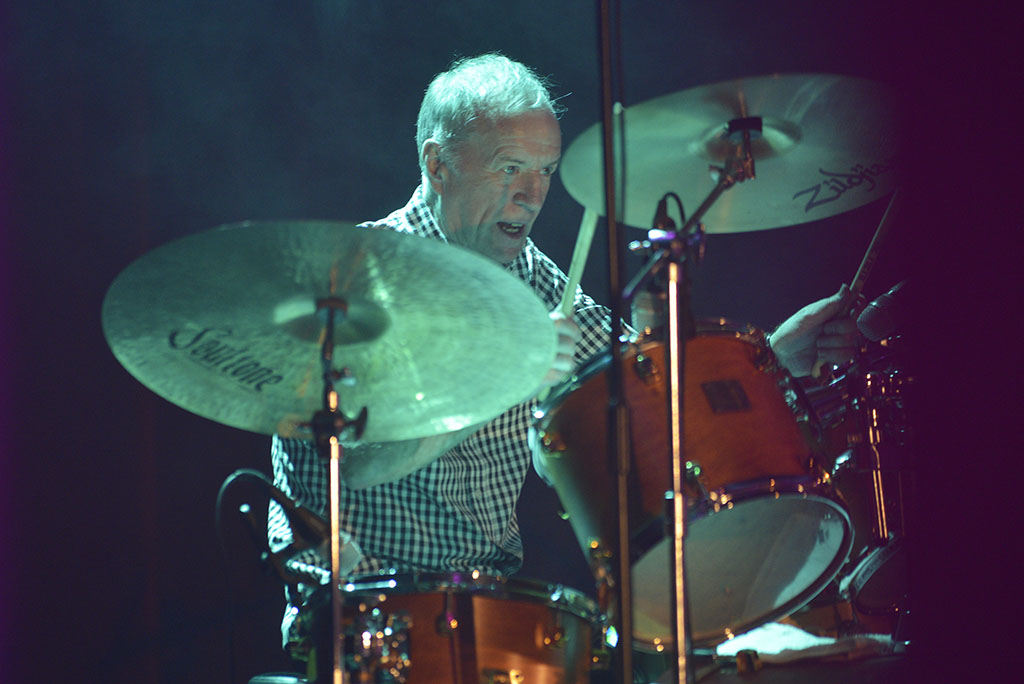
- Steel during an Animals concert in Bielsko-Biala, Poland, 2016

Background information
- Born: 4 February 1941 (age 85); Gateshead, County Durham, England
- Genres: Rock, R&B
- Occupation: Musician
- Instrument: Drums

John Steel (born 4 February 1941) is an English musician who is the long-serving drummer for the British rock band the Animals. Having served as the band's drummer at its inception in 1963, he is the only original band member playing in the current incarnation of the Animals. He was inducted with the band into the Rock and Roll Hall of Fame in 1994.

== Early life ==
John Steel was the youngest of four children. He attended Gateshead Grammar School. As a child, he and his siblings took piano lessons, though only Steel would go on to have a career in music. Growing up, Steel was exposed to records from Bing Crosby, Al Jolson, Fats Waller and Sid Phillips.

== Career ==
=== Early career ===
Steel started his career as a musician while still in school around 1957. He met the future lead singer of the Animals, Eric Burdon, while they were studying together at the Newcastle College of Art and Industrial Design. After the college and before forming the band, he obtained a job in the drawing office of an aircraft company, which he later labelled "awful".

His main instrument at this time was the trumpet, which was the instrument he played in the first group that he and Burdon were in together. Steel's musical influences initially came from traditional jazz, but he later drew influence from modern jazz. When he transitioned to drums, Steel admired jazz drummers such as Elvin Jones and Art Blakey. They switched from jazz to embrace the new rock 'n' roll explosion.

When I played drums rather than trumpet I never felt really confident enough, because the people I was influenced by and admired were jazz drummers ... There was no way I was going to be that good so I never considered myself good enough to aspire to that kind of thing. But somehow I just accidentally fell into rock 'n' roll and R&B.

— John Steel, Interview, 2011.

=== The Animals ===
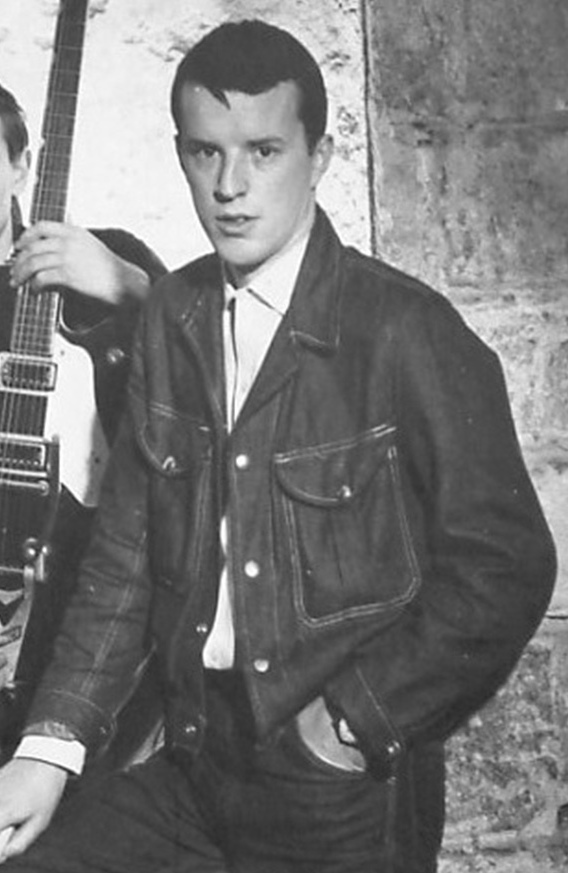
Steel with the Animals in 1964

In March 1959, Steel met Alan Price at a church hop in Byker, Newcastle, and with Hilton Valentine (guitar) and Chas Chandler (bass) formed a band; by 1960 the Alan Price Combo had acquired a reputation in Newcastle. Burdon joined in 1962 from a band called the Pagans, and the Animals were born. Their career went worldwide in late 1964 with their rendition of the traditional folk song The House of the Rising Sun.

Steel went on to play and record with them until February 1966. His last charted single with the group was "Inside Looking Out". Over the years Steel has remained active as a part-time local drummer and has joined several Animals' reunion incarnations.

In 1977, Steel played and recorded with the original members of The Animals during a brief reunion and he joined them again for a further revival in 1983.

Steel, with all but lead singer Eric Burdon of the classic members, were present at the bands induction into the Rock and Roll Hall of Fame in 1994.

=== Business career and Eggs over Easy ===
Subsequently, Steel returned to Newcastle and became a businessman, while also working in former bandmate Chas Chandler's management and publishing organisations. In 1971, Chandler introduced him to the band Eggs over Easy, with whom he played as they started the pub rock music genre.

=== Newer versions of The Animals ===
Since 1993, Steel has toured as the drummer with variations of the Animals line-up including Hilton Valentine, Dave Rowberry, Zoot Money and Mick Gallagher.

In 1993, Hilton Valentine formed "Animals II", which was joined by John Steel in 1994 and Dave Rowberry in 1999. Other members of this version of the band include Steve Hutchinson on keyboards, Steve Dawson and Martin Bland. From 1999 until Valentine's departure in 2001, the band toured as the Animals.

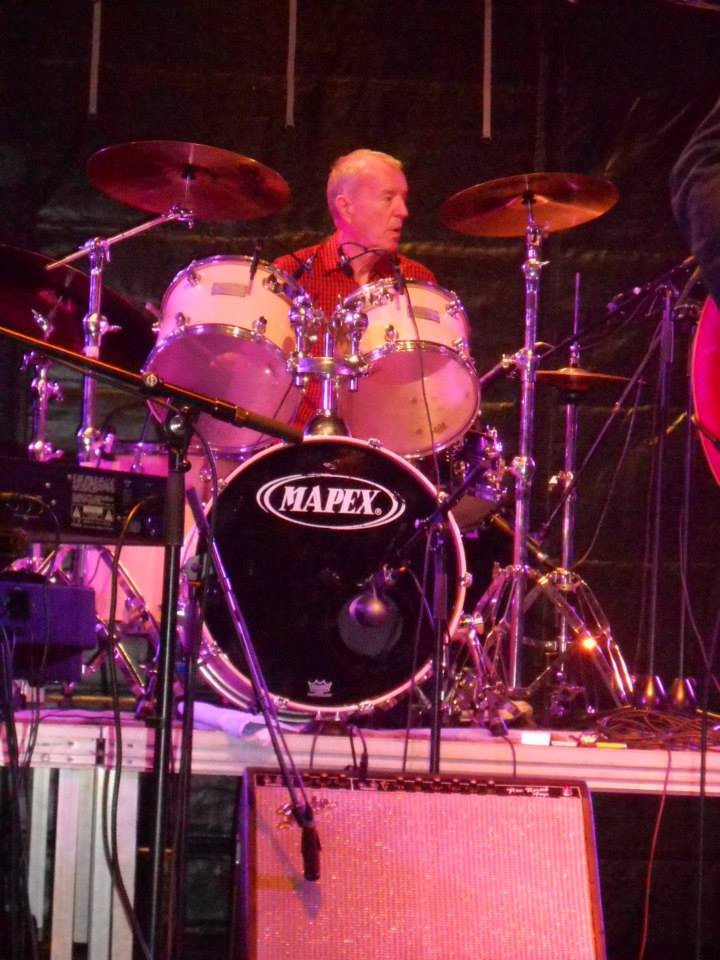
John Steel during a concert of Animals & Friends in Hastière-Lavaux, Belgium

After Valentine left this Animals incarnation in 2001, Steel and Rowberry continued as "Animals and Friends", with Peter Barton, Jim Rodford and John Williamson, joined on occasion by ex-"New Animals" bassist Danny McCulloch. When Rowberry died in 2003, he was replaced by Mickey Gallagher (who had briefly replaced Alan Price in 1965). Animals and Friends continues to perform today, and frequently plays engagements on a Color Line ship that travels between Scandinavia and Germany.

=== Other works ===
In 2003, Steel provided an invited review of Sick of Being Me, a novel by Sean Egan, a novelist and journalist with a number of publications relating to the music industry. The novel concerned the challenges to a struggling musician in the 1990s.

=== Ownership of Animals name ===
In 2008, an adjudicator determined that John Steel owned "The Animals" name in Britain, by virtue of a trademark registration Steel had made in relation to the name. Eric Burdon had objected to the trademark registration, arguing that Burdon personally embodied any goodwill associated with the Animals name. Burdon's argument was rejected, in part based on the fact that he had billed himself as "Eric Burdon and the Animals" as early as 1967, thus separating the goodwill associated with his own name from that of the band.

In 2013, Eric Burdon won an appeal, allowing both to use the Animals name.
