= Hilton Valentine =

British guitarist (1943–2021)

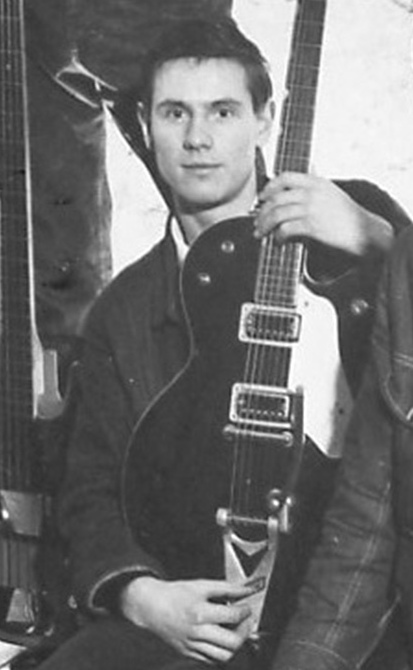
- Valentine in 1964

Background information
- Born: Hilton Stewart Paterson Valentine; 21 May 1943; North Shields, Northumberland, England
- Died: 29 January 2021 (aged 77) Connecticut, U.S.
- Genres: Rock, blues rock, folk rock
- Occupation: Guitarist
- Years active: 1963–2021
- Website: hiltonvalentine.com

Hilton Stewart Paterson Valentine (21 May 1943 – 29 January 2021) was an English skiffle and rock and roll musician who was the original guitarist in the Animals. He was inducted into the Rock and Roll Hall of Fame in 1994 and into Hollywood’s Rock Walk of Fame in 2001 with the other members of the Animals.

Following the Animals' breakup in 1966, Valentine produced several solo albums including All in Your Head (1969) and It’s Folk ‘N’ Skiffle, Mate! (2004). He also toured New England and participated in several reunions with the Animals.

== Early life ==
Valentine was born in North Shields, Northumberland, England, and was influenced by the 1950s skiffle craze. His mother bought him his first guitar in 1956 when he was 13, he taught himself some chords from a book called Teach Yourself a Thousand Chords.

== Early career ==
He continued to develop his musical talent at Tynemouth Municipal High School and formed his own skiffle group called the Heppers. They played local gigs and a newspaper described them at the time as, "A young but promising skiffle group". The Heppers eventually evolved into a rock and roll band, the Wildcats in c. 1959. During this period Valentine played a Futurama III solid guitar, this was the UK brandname of importer Selmer, his next guitar was a Burns Vibra-Artiste which he bought in 1960–61. The Wildcats were a popular band in the Tyneside area, getting a lot of bookings for dance halls, working men's clubs, church halls etc., and it was during this period that they decided to record a 10" acetate LP titled Sounds of the Wild Cats (sic).

== Professional career ==
=== The Animals ===
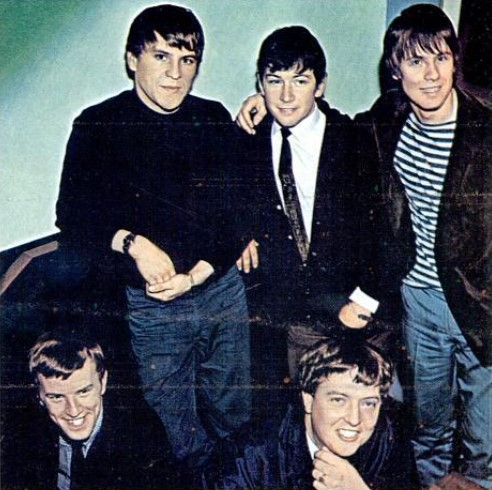
Valentine (far right) with the Animals in 1965

In 1963, the Animals were starting to form and Chas Chandler heard about Hilton Valentine's wild guitar playing and asked him to join what was then the Alan Price Combo. Eric Burdon was already a member and John Steel joined immediately following Valentine's arrival. Within a few months, this group changed their name to the Animals.

While the Animals are often remembered most for Burdon's vocals and Price's organ, Valentine is credited with the electric guitar arpeggio introduction to the Animals' 1964 signature song "The House of the Rising Sun", which inspired countless beginner guitarists. It was played on his Gretsch Tennessean guitar which he bought in Newcastle in early 1962 while he was still with the Wildcats, and a Selmer amplifier. Later, in 1964, Rickenbacker gave him a 1964 Rose Morris guitar to use along with a 12-string model. Valentine continued to play and record with the Animals, until the first incarnation of the band dissolved in September 1966.

==== Reunions ====
In 1977, Valentine rejoined the group and recorded a reunion album called Before We Were So Rudely Interrupted.

Along with Eric Burdon, Chas Chandler, Alan Price and John Steel, Valentine was inducted into the Rock and Roll Hall of Fame in 1994. Along with the other Animals, Hilton was inducted into Hollywood's Rock Walk of Fame in May 2001.

=== Later career ===
After he left the Animals, Valentine moved to California and in 1969 recorded a solo album entitled All In Your Head, which was not successful.The album was produced and arranged by later Animals member Vic Briggs. Not long after the album was fully complete and released, Valentine then returned to the UK. He released a new album, It's Folk 'n' Skiffle, Mate! in 2004.

From that release until October 2009 he played throughout New England, New York and South Carolina, with his Skiffledog solo project. As well, from February 2007 to November 2008 Valentine toured with Eric Burdon. In 2011, Valentine released a new album titled Skiffledog on Coburg Street and a Christmas album with Big Boy Pete Miller (ex-Peter Jay and the Jaywalkers) titled Merry Skifflemas!.

Valentine's last recording was "River Tyne", a 2019 video that celebrated the river close to his boyhood home.

== Death ==
Valentine died on 29 January 2021 at the age of 77.

== Legacy ==
The Animals' version of the "House of the Rising Sun" is generally considered to be the definitive version of the song, and was cited by Bob Dylan as one of the reasons why he transitioned from acoustic to electric sound. Speaking of Valentine's opening riff for the song, Ian MacDonald noted that "It is one of the most instantly recognizable introductions to one of the most memorable songs of the 60s. A seemingly simple, but technically perfect execution of an on-going arpeggio figure over a repeated chord progression in A minor, which countless budding guitarists have tried to emulate over the decades, though rarely with such accuracy and precision."

== Honours ==
On 16 November 2021, a blue plaque was placed by North Tyneside Council on Valentine's childhood home at 42 Coburg Street, North Shields, where he lived between 1944 and 1960. The plaque was unveiled by Valentine's widow.

== Discography ==
The Animals

Solo

- All in Your Head (1969)
- It’s Folk 'N' Skiffle, Mate! (2004)
- Skiffledog On Coburg St (2011)
- Merry Skifflemas (2011 with Big Boy Pete)

== See also ==
- List of guitarists
