= The Animals =

English rock band

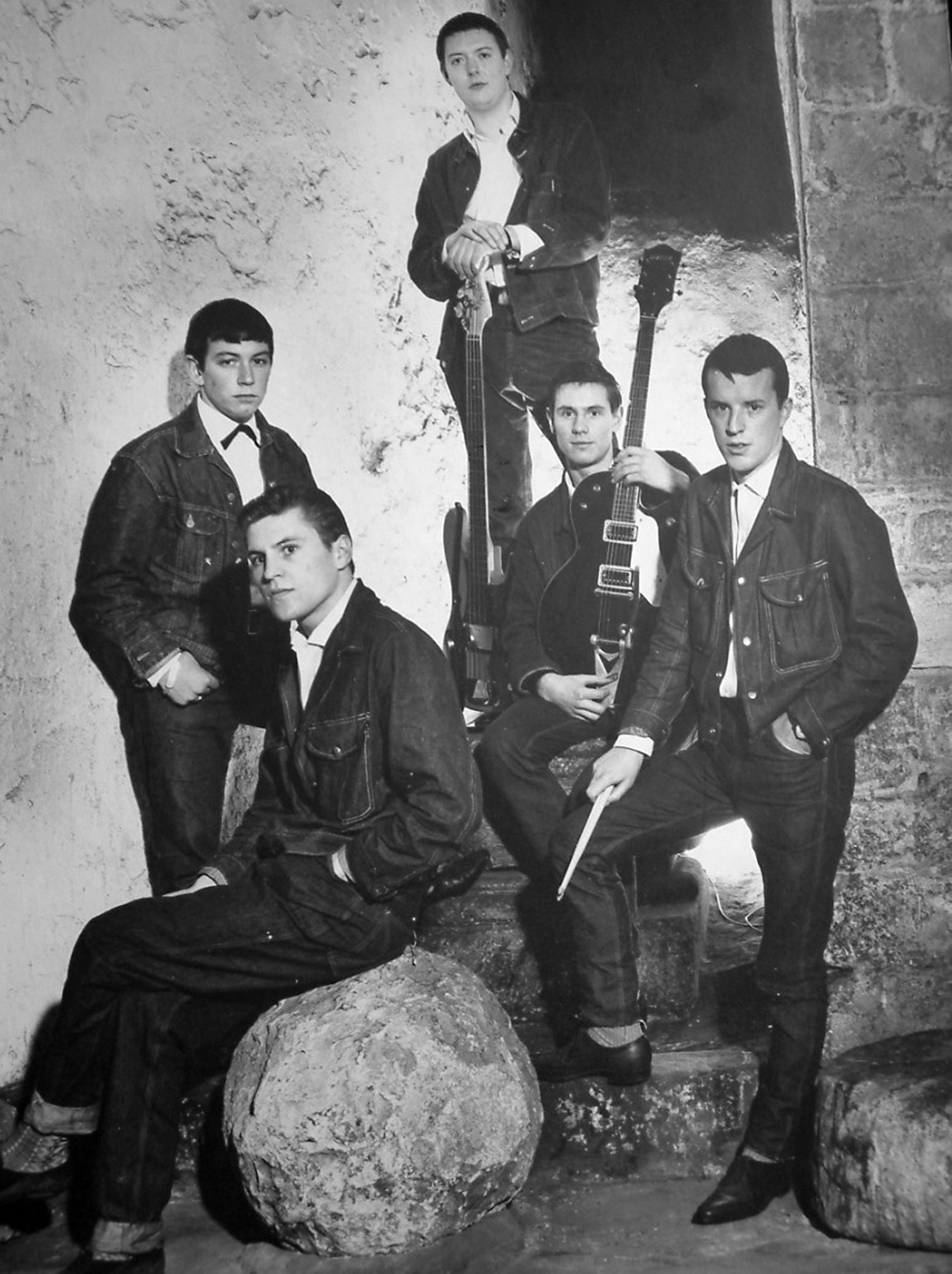
- Posing for publicity in 1964: from left to right, Eric Burdon (vocals), Alan Price (keyboards), Chas Chandler (bass), Hilton Valentine (guitar), John Steel (drums)

Background information
- Also known as: The Alan Price Combo; Eric Burdon and the Animals (1966–1969, 2003–2008, 2016–2020); Valentine's Animals; Animals II; Animals & Friends
- Origin: Newcastle upon Tyne, England
- Genres: Blues rock; R&B; psychedelic rock; progressive rock; rock and roll
- Years active: 1962–1969; 1975–1977; 1983; 1992–present
- Labels: Columbia (EMI); Decca; MGM; Jet; I.R.S.; Atco; Atlantic; Barn
- Members: Eric Burdon and the Animals: Eric Burdon; Johnzo West; Davey Allen; Dustin Koester; Justin Andres; Ruben Salinas; Evan Mackey; Animals and Friends: John Steel; Norman Helm; Danny Handley; Barney Williams
- Past members: Chas Chandler; Hilton Valentine; Alan Price; Mick Gallagher; Dave Rowberry; Barry Jenkins; John Weider; Vic Briggs; Danny McCulloch; Zoot Money; Andy Summers

The Animals are an English rock band formed in Newcastle upon Tyne in 1962. Their original lineup consisted of singer Eric Burdon, guitarist Hilton Valentine, bass guitarist Chas Chandler, keyboardist Alan Price, and drummer John Steel. Known for their gritty, bluesy sound, they balanced tough, rock-edged pop singles against rhythm-and-blues-oriented album material, and were part of the British Invasion of the US.

The Animals rose to prominence with their signature song and transatlantic number-one hit single "The House of the Rising Sun", and continued this success with hits such as "I'm Crying", "Don't Let Me Be Misunderstood", "Bring It On Home to Me", "We Gotta Get Out of This Place", "It's My Life", "Inside-Looking Out", "Don't Bring Me Down", and "See See Rider". Price and Steel departed in mid-1965 and early 1966, respectively, while poor business management led the band to split up by the end of 1966. Burdon then assembled a mostly new lineup of musicians under the name Eric Burdon and the Animals; the much-changed act moved to California and achieved commercial success as a psychedelic and progressive rock band, with hits such as "Help Me Girl", "When I Was Young", "San Franciscan Nights", "Good Times", "Monterey", and "Sky Pilot", before disbanding at the end of the decade.

The original lineup of Burdon, Price, Chandler, Valentine, and Steel reunited for a one-off benefit concert in Newcastle in 1968. They later released and toured in support of two reunion albums during 1975–1977 and 1983. Altogether, the band has had 10 top-20 hits in both the UK Singles Chart and the US Billboard Hot 100. The original lineup was inducted into the Rock and Roll Hall of Fame in 1994.

There are currently two incarnations of the Animals in co-existence: Eric Burdon and the Animals with original singer Eric Burdon, and Animals and Friends with original drummer John Steel.

== History ==
=== The Animals (1962–1966) ===
The Animals formed in Newcastle upon Tyne in 1962, when Eric Burdon joined the Alan Price Rhythm and Blues Combo. The original lineup was Burdon (vocals), Price (organ and keyboards), Hilton Valentine (guitar), Bryan "Chas" Chandler (bass), and John Steel (drums).

Originally formed as the Alan Price Combo, they changed their name to the Animals. They were supposedly dubbed "animals" because of their wild stage act, and the name stuck. In a 2013 interview, Burdon denied this, stating that the name was a tribute to a friend known as "Animal" Hogg. In a 2021 interview, Steel stated that the name was given to them by Graham Bond.

The Animals performed fiery versions of the staple rhythm and blues repertoire, covering songs by artists such as Jimmy Reed, John Lee Hooker, and Nina Simone. Signed to EMI's Columbia label, their first single was "Baby Let Me Take You Home", a rock-based rewrite of the standard "Baby Let Me Follow You Down".

In June 1964, the transatlantic number-one hit "The House of the Rising Sun" was released. Burdon's vocals and the particular arrangement, featuring Price's haunting organ riffs, created perhaps the first folk-rock hit.

In October 1964, the Animals visited New York City for concert dates and an appearance on The Ed Sullivan Show. They were transported from the airport into Manhattan in a motorcade consisting of Sunbeam Alpine Series IV top-down convertibles with fashion models riding along. The Animals sang "I'm Crying" and "The House of the Rising Sun". In December, the MGM film Get Yourself a College Girl was released, featuring the Animals and the Dave Clark Five. The Animals sang the Chuck Berry song "Around and Around" in the film.

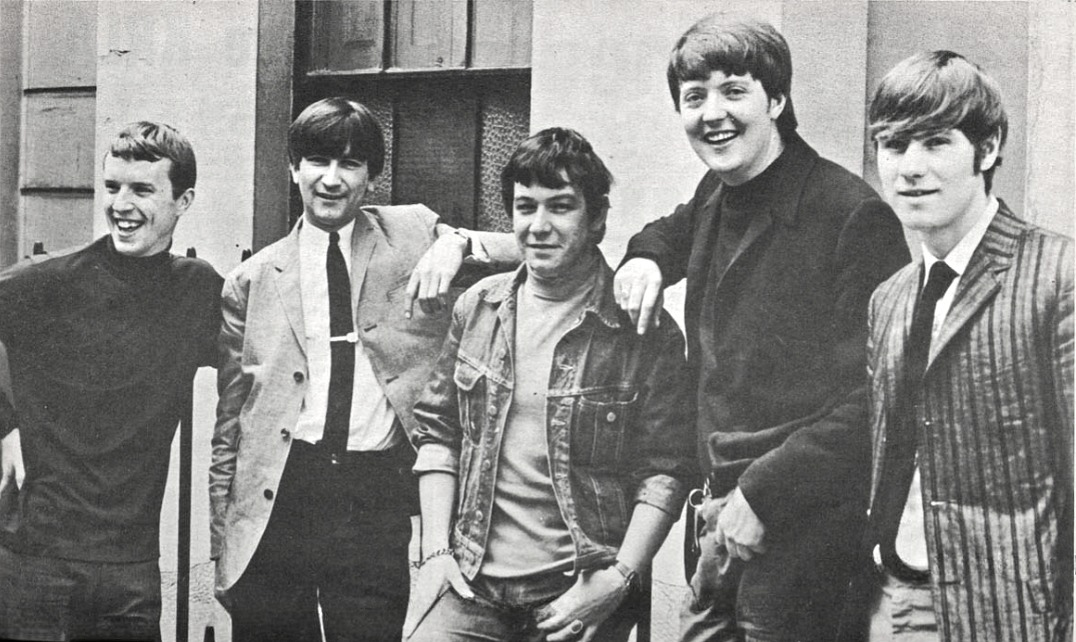
The Animals in 1965, after Dave Rowberry (second from left) had replaced original keyboardist Alan Price

By May 1965, the group was starting to feel internal pressures. Price left because of personal and musical differences, as well as his fear of flying while on tour. He went on to a successful career as a solo artist and with the Alan Price Set. Mick Gallagher filled in for Price on keyboards for a short time until Dave Rowberry replaced Gallagher. Rowberry was on hand for the hit songs "We Gotta Get Out of This Place" and "It's My Life".

Many of the Animals' hits originated from Brill Building songwriters recruited by Mickie Most, but the group, and Burdon in particular, felt this to be too creatively restrictive. As 1965 ended, the group signed a new deal with their American label MGM Records for the US and Canada, and switched to Decca Records for the rest of the world. They also ended their association with Most and began to work with MGM Records producer Tom Wilson, who allowed them more artistic freedom. In early 1966, MGM collected the band's hits on The Best of The Animals, and it became their best-selling album in the US. In February 1966, Steel left and was replaced by Barry Jenkins. A leftover rendition of Goffin–King's "Don't Bring Me Down" was the group's last hit as the Animals. The next single, "See See Rider", was credited to Eric Burdon and the Animals. By September 1966, the original incarnation of the group had split up. Their last batch of recordings was released on the album Animalism in November 1966.

Burdon began work on a solo album called Eric Is Here, which also featured his UK number-14 solo hit single "Help Me, Girl", which he heavily promoted on TV shows such as Ready Steady Go! and Top of the Pops in late 1966. Eric Is Here was Burdon's final release for Decca Records.

By this time, the Animals' business affairs "were in a total shambles" according to Chandler, and the group disbanded.

=== Eric Burdon and The Animals (1966–1969) ===
Eric Burdon and the Animals in 1967: Foreground: Eric Burdon Background (L–R): Danny McCulloch, John Weider (in striped shirt), Vic Briggs, and Barry Jenkins

A group with Burdon, Jenkins, and new sidemen John Weider (guitar/violin/bass), Vic Briggs (guitar/piano), and Danny McCulloch (bass) was formed under the name Eric Burdon and Animals (or sometimes Eric Burdon and the New Animals) in December 1966, and changed direction. The new lineup pursued a fusion of progressive rock, psychedelic, soul, and folk music that was far removed from their original blues-oriented sound.

Early performances by this group did not include any of the hits for which the original group had become known. Some of the new Animals' hits included "San Franciscan Nights", "Monterey", and "Sky Pilot". Their sound was much heavier than that of the original group, with Burdon screaming more and louder on live versions of "Paint It Black" and "Hey Gyp". By 1968, they had developed a more experimental sound on songs such as "We Love You Lil" and the 19-minute "New York 1963–America 1968" from the album Every One of Us.

Zoot Money was added to the lineup in April 1968, initially as organist/pianist only, but upon McCulloch's departure, he also took on bass and occasional lead vocals.

In July 1968, Andy Summers (later the guitarist for the Police) replaced Briggs. Both Money and Summers were formerly of British psychedelic outfit Dantalian's Chariot, and much of this new lineup's set was composed of Dantalian's Chariot songs, which caught Burdon's interest. Because of Money's multi-instrumental load, in live settings, bass was played alternately by Weider and Summers.

By December 1968, this incarnation of the Animals had dissolved, but their double album Love Is was released internationally, featuring the singles "Ring of Fire" and "River Deep – Mountain High".

Numerous reasons have been cited for the breakup, the most famous of which involved an aborted Japanese tour. The tour had been scheduled for September 1968, but was delayed until November after difficulty obtaining visas. Only a few dates into the tour, the promoters (whom the band did not know were yakuza) kidnapped the band's manager and threatened him at gunpoint to write an IOU for $25,000 to cover losses incurred by the tour's delay. Correctly surmising that his captors could not read English, he added a note to the IOU that it was written under duress. The yakuza released him, but warned that the band and he would have to leave Japan the next day or be killed. The Animals promptly fled the country, leaving all of their tour equipment behind. Money and Summers each pursued solo careers, Weider signed up with Family, and Burdon joined forces with a funk/R&B/rock group from Long Beach, California, called War.

=== Reunions of the Animals ===
The original Animals lineup of Burdon, Price, Valentine, Chandler, and Steel reunited for a benefit concert in Newcastle in December 1968, and reformed in late 1975 to record again. Burdon later said that nobody understood why they had agreed to this short reunion. They embarked on a brief tour in 1976 and shot videos for their new songs such as "Lonely Avenue" and "Please Send Me Someone to Love". They released an album in 1977 that was aptly titled Before We Were So Rudely Interrupted. The album received critical praise. Burdon and Valentine also recorded some demonstration tapes at that time that were never released. On 12 December 1982, Burdon performed with Price and a complete lineup, foreshadowing future events.

All five original band members reunited in 1983 for the album Ark and a world concert tour, supplemented by Zoot Money on keyboards, Nippy Noya on percussion, Steve Gregory on saxophone, and Steve Grant on guitar. The first single, "The Night", reached number 48 on the Billboard Hot 100 chart. The band released a second single called "Love Is for All Time", which did not chart.

Songs performed on the Ark tour included some from the 1960s, but most were from the band's contemporary repertoire, such as "Heart Attack", "No More Elmore" (both released a year earlier by Burdon), "Oh Lucky Man" (from the 1973 soundtrack album to O Lucky Man! by Price), "It's Too Late", "Tango", and "Young Girls" (later released on Burdon's compilation album The Night). Their Wembley Arena concert on 31 December 1983 (supporting the Police) was released on the Rip It to Shreds live album in 1984 after the Animals had disbanded again. Their 29 November 1983 concert at the Royal Oak Theatre in Royal Oak, Michigan, was released on 27 February 2008 as Last Live Show. A film about the reunion tour was shot but never released.

Chandler died from an aneurysm in 1996, putting an end to any possibility of another reunion of the full original lineup.

=== Later incarnations ===
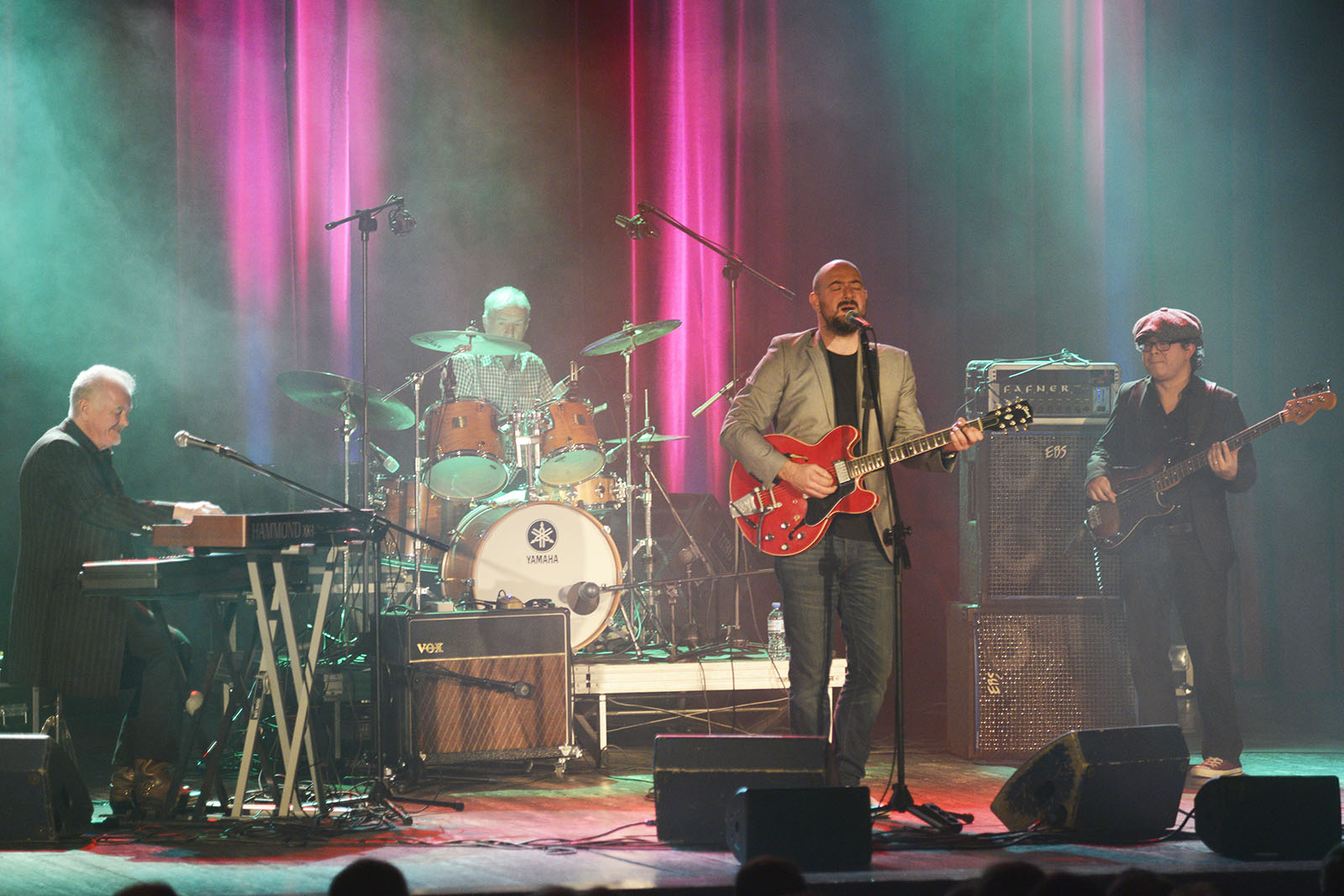
The Animals during a concert in Poland, 2016

Since the 1990s, several groups have called themselves the Animals in part:

- In the 1990s, Danny McCulloch, from the later-1960s Animals, released several albums as the Animals. Presented as Animals best of/greatest hits collections, these albums contained covers of the Animals' hits, as well as new songs written by McCulloch.
- In 1992, Barry Jenkins joined a reconstituted version of The Animals, including "New Animals" members Vic Briggs and Danny McCulloch along with new percussionist Jack McCulloch and Phil Ryan instead of Eric Burdon on lead vocals. The band played the first rock concert held in Red Square, Moscow, as part of a benefit concert for the victims of the Chernobyl nuclear disaster.
- The band then morphed into Animals and Friends, with Peter Barton on vocals, Rodford, and John E. Williamson on guitar. When Rowberry died in 2003, he was replaced by Mick Gallagher (who had briefly replaced Price in 1965). Danny Handley joined the band in 2009, initially as lead guitarist, but replaced Barton on lead vocals when Barton retired in 2012. This successful lineup continues to tour the world with guests such as Steve Cropper and Spencer Davis.
- Burdon formed a new backing band in 1998 that was billed as Eric Burdon and the New Animals. This was actually just a renaming of an existing band with whom he had been touring in various forms since 1990. Members of this new group included Dean Restum, Dave Meros, Neal Morse and Aynsley Dunbar. Martin Gerschwitz replaced Morse in 1999 after Ryo Okumoto's brief three-week stint, and Dunbar was replaced by Bernie Pershey in 2001. In 2003, the band started touring as Eric Burdon and the Animals. After the lineup changed in 2006, original guitarist Valentine joined the group for its 2007 and 2008 tours. The group also included Red Young, Paula O'Rourke and Tony Braunagle. After Burdon lost the rights to the name, he formed a new band with different musicians.
- In 2016, Burdon formed the current lineup of Eric Burdon and the Animals, including Johnzo West (guitar/vocals), Davey Allen (keys/vocals), Dustin Koester (drums/vocals), Justin Andres (bass guitar/vocals), Ruben Salinas (sax/flute) and Evan Mackey (trombone). The band performed at the Fool In Love Festival amongst other legendary performers in Los Angeles, CA on 31 August 2024.

=== Dispute over ownership of band name ===
In 2008, an adjudicator determined that original Animals drummer John Steel owned "the Animals" name in the UK because of a trademark registration that Steel had filed. Eric Burdon had objected to the trademark registration, arguing that he personally embodied any goodwill associated with "the Animals" name. Burdon's argument was rejected, in part because he had billed himself as "Eric Burdon and the Animals" as early as 1967, thus separating the goodwill associated with his own name from that of the band. On 9 September 2013, Burdon's appeal was allowed, and he is now permitted to use the name "the Animals".

=== Legacy ===
The original Animals were inducted into the Rock and Roll Hall of Fame in 1994, although Burdon did not attend and the band did not perform. In 2003, the band's version of "The House of the Rising Sun" ranked number 123 on Rolling Stone's 500 Greatest Songs of All Time list. Their 1965 hit single "We Gotta Get Out of This Place" was ranked number 233 on the same list. Both songs are included in the Rock and Roll Hall of Fame's 500 Songs That Shaped Rock and Roll.

On 15 March 2012, in a keynote speech to an audience at the South by Southwest music festival, Bruce Springsteen discussed the Animals' influence on his music at length, stating, "To me, the Animals were a revelation. They were the first records with full-blown class consciousness that I'd ever heard." Of "We Gotta Get Out of This Place" (written by two New York songwriters, Barry Mann and Cynthia Weil), Springsteen said: "That's every song I've ever written ... That's 'Born to Run,' 'Born in the U.S.A.,' everything I've done for the past 40 years including all the new ones. That struck me so deep. It was the first time I felt I heard something come across the radio that mirrored my home life, my childhood." Saying that his album Darkness on the Edge of Town was "filled with Animals", Springsteen played the opening riffs to "Don't Let Me Be Misunderstood" and his own "Badlands" back to back, then said, "Listen up, youngsters! This is how successful theft is accomplished!"

Tony Banks, keyboardist of the English progressive rock band Genesis, drew influence from Alan Price, whom he regarded as "[t]he first person who made me aware of the organ in a rock context".

== Awards and nominations ==
Year	Awards	Work	Category	Result
1964	NME Awards	"The House of the Rising Sun"	British Disc of the Year	Won

== Members ==
=== The Animals (1963–1966, 1975–1977, 1983) ===
- Eric Burdon – vocals (1963–1966, 1975–1977, 1983)
- Chas Chandler – bass, backing vocals (1963–1966, 1975–1977, 1983)
- Hilton Valentine – guitar, backing vocals (1963–1966, 1975–1977, 1983)
- John Steel – drums (1963–1966, 1975–1977, 1983)
- Alan Price – keyboards, backing vocals (1963–1965, 1975–1977, 1983)
- Mick Gallagher – keyboards, backing vocals (1965)
- Dave Rowberry – keyboards, backing vocals (1965–1966)
- Barry Jenkins – drums, backing vocals (1966)

=== Eric Burdon and The Animals (1966–1969) ===
- Eric Burdon – vocals (1966–1969)
- Barry Jenkins – drums, backing vocals (1966–1969)
- John Weider – guitar, bass, violin, backing vocals (1966–1969)
- Vic Briggs – guitar, piano, bass (1966–1968)
- Danny McCulloch – bass, vocals, guitar (1966–1968)
- Zoot Money – keyboards, bass, vocals (1968–1969)
- Andy Summers – guitar, bass, backing vocals (1968–1969)

=== Eric Burdon and The Animals (2016–present) ===
- Eric Burdon – vocals (2016–present)
- Johnzo West – guitar, vocals (2016–present)
- Justin Andres – bass, vocals (2016–present)
- Davey Allen – keyboards, vocals (2016–present)
- Dustin Koester – drums, vocals (2016–present)
- Justin Andres – bass, vocals (2016–present)
- Ruben Salinas – saxophone, flute (2016–present)
- Evan Mackey – trombone (2016–present)

=== Animals and Friends (1992–present) ===
- John Steel – drums (1994–present)
- Danny Handley – guitar, vocals (2009–present)
- Barney Williams – keyboards (2022–present)
- Norman Helm – bass, vocals (2023–present)
- Hilton Valentine – guitar (1992–2001)
- Robert Kane – vocals (1992–1999)
- George Fearon – guitar (1992–1994)
- Joss Elliott – bass (1992–1994)
- Dave Dodsworth – drums (1992–1994)
- Fred Hill – bass (1994–1995)
- Dave Whiffin – guitar (1994–1995)
- Steve Hutchinson – keyboards (1994–1999)
- Steve Dawson – guitar (1995–1999, 2001–2002)
- Martin Bland – bass (1995–1999)
- Dave Rowberry – keyboards (1999–2003)
- Tony Liddle – vocals (1999–2001, 2001–2002)
- Jim Rodford – bass (1999–2003; died 2018)
- Steve 'ih' Farrell – backing vocals, percussion (1999)
- Eamon Cronin – vocals (2001)
- John E. Williamson – guitar vocals (2001–2009)
- Pete Barton – vocals, bass, guitar (2001–2011)
- Mick Gallagher – keyboards, backing vocals (2003–2022)

== Discography ==
As the Animals

- The Animals (1964; US)
- The Animals (1964; UK)
- The Animals on Tour (1965; US)
- Animal Tracks (1965; UK)
- Animal Tracks (1965; US)
- Animalisms (1966; UK)
- Animalization (1966; US)
- Animalism (1966; US)

As Eric Burdon and the Animals

- Eric Is Here (1967; US)
- Winds of Change (1967)
- The Twain Shall Meet (1968)
- Every One of Us (1968; US)
- Love Is (1968)

As the Animals (reunions)

- Before We Were So Rudely Interrupted (1977)
- Ark (1983)

== See also ==
- Monterey Pop Festival
