= Eric Burdon discography =

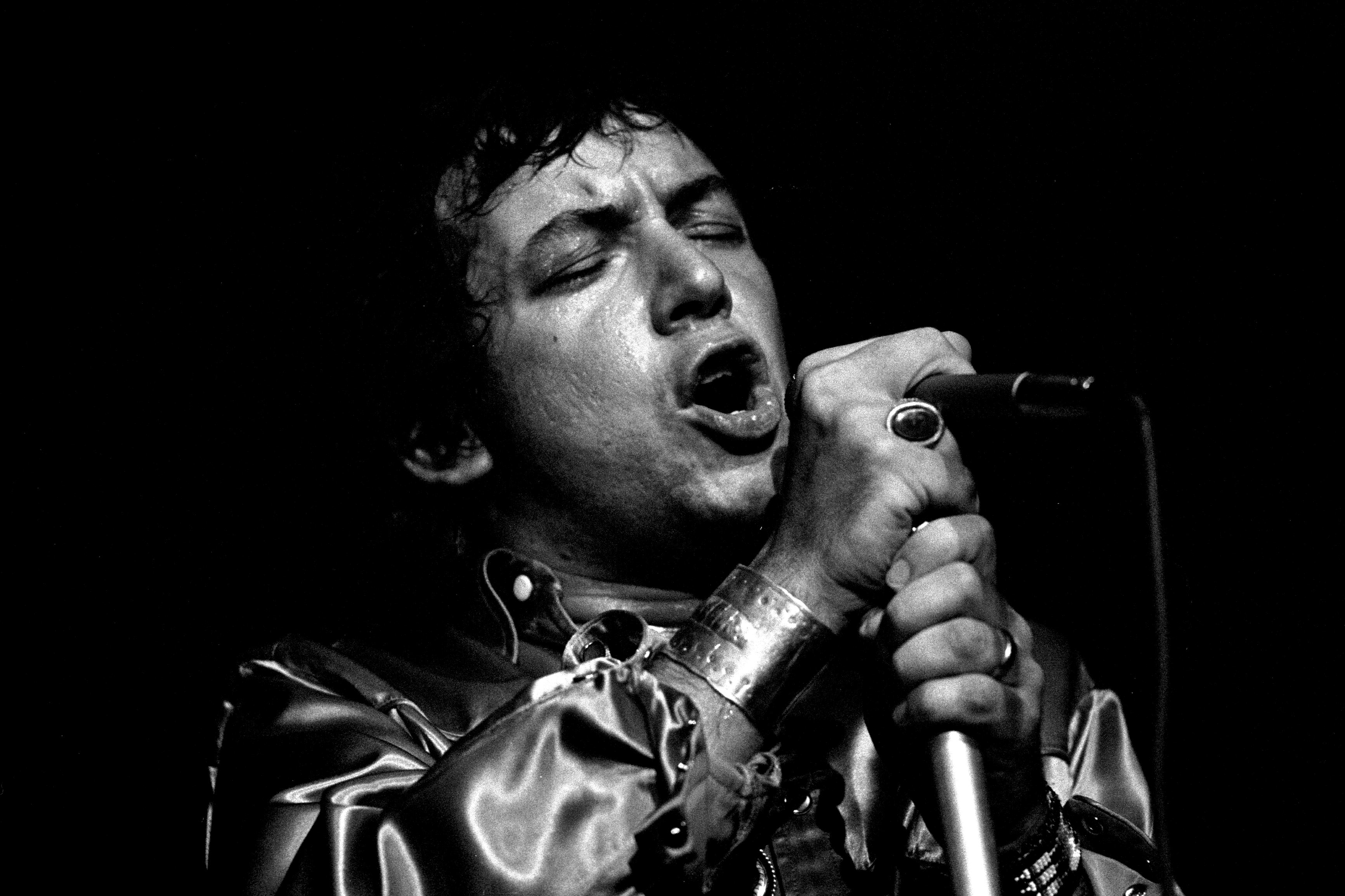
- Eric Burdon at the Audimax in Hamburg, July 1973
- Studio albums: 31
- Live albums: 13
- Compilation albums: 34
- Singles: 51

Eric Burdon was a lead vocalist with The Animals, War, and other bands.

== Studio albums ==
With The Animals, Eric Burdon & The Animals, The Original Animals use the link below.

Eric Burdon & War

- Eric Burdon Declares "War" – 1970, No. 18 US, No. 47 in US Black Albums, No. 50 in UK, No. 7 in AUS, No. 11 in CAN, No. 14 in GER
- The Black-Man's Burdon (double album) – 1970, No. 80 US, No. 17 in AUS, No. 38 in CAN, No. 20 in GER
- Love Is All Around – 1976, No. 140 US

Eric Burdon & Jimmy Witherspoon

- Guilty! – 1971 (Re-released in 1976 as "Black & White Blues")

The Eric Burdon Band

- Sun Secrets – 1974, No. 51 US, No. 84 in CAN
- Stop – 1975, No. 171 US, No. 85 in CAN
- Comeback – 1982

Eric Burdon

- Survivor – 1977
- Darkness Darkness – 1980
- The Last Drive – 1980
- Power Company – 1983
- I Used To Be An Animal – 1988
- Lost Within the Halls of Fame – 1995
- My Secret Life – 2004, No. 93 in DE
- Soul of a Man – 2006, No. 43 in DE, No. 165 in FR
- Mirage – 2008
- Eric Burdon & The Greenhornes – 2012
- 'Til Your River Runs Dry – 2013, No. 57 in DE

== Live albums ==
- 1965 – In The Beginning
- 1973 – The Animals with Sonny Boy Williamson
- 1984 – Rip It To Shreds: Greatest Hits Live, No. 195 in US
- 1985 – That's Live
- 1993 – Access All Areas*
- 1996 – Eric Burdon Live
- 1998 – Live at the Roxy
- 2000 – The Official Live Bootleg #1
- 2000 – The Official Live Bootleg #2
- 2001 – The Official Live Bootleg 2000
- 2002 – Live in Seattle 2002
- 2005 – Athens Traffic Live*
- 2009 – Live 17th October 1974

* indicates an album that contains both live and studio tracks

== Compilations ==
- 1966 The Best of the Animals, No. 6 in US
- 1966 The Most of Animals (UK), No. 4 in UK
- 1967 The Best of Eric Burdon & The Animals, Vol. II, No. 71 in US
- 1969 The Greatest Hits of Eric Burdon and The Animals, No. 153 in US
- 1971 The Most of Animals, No. 18 in UK
- 1973 The Best of The Animals (double album), No. 188 in US
- 1973 Starportrait, No. 36 in GER
- 1976 Mad Man
- 1980 Eric Burdon and the Animals
- 1982 Eric Burdon's Greatest Animal Hits
- 1984 The Road
- 1987 Star portrait
- 1988 Wicked Man
- 1988 The Best of The Animals
- 1990 Very Best of Eric Burdon & The Animals, No. 36 in GER
- 1992 Good Times: A Collection
- 1994 Sings The Animals' Greatest Hits
- 1994 The Comeback Soundtrack (double album)
- 1995 Misunderstood
- 1995 Rare Masters Vol. 1
- 1996 Rare Masters Vol. 2
- 1996 The Best of Eric Burdon & War
- 1997 Soldier of Fortune
- 1997 The Best of The Animals
- 1997 The Animals' Greatest Hits
- 1999 F*** me... I thought he was Dead - Greatest Hits Alive
- 1999 Absolutely the Best
- 2001 San Franciscan Nights
- 2002 He Used to be an Animal
- 2003 Absolute Animals 1964–1968
- 2004 Gold: The Eric Burdon Story (double album)
- 2004 The Best of Eric Burdon
- 2005 It's My Life
- 2006 Wild & Wicked
- 2006 Tobacco Road
- 2007 The Hits
- 2007 I'm A Wicked Man
- 2008 Ultimate Rarities Vol. 1
- 2008 Ultimate Rarities Vol. 2

== Singles ==
Year	Title	Chart positions										
Year	Title	UK	UK Indie	US	US Main. Rock	AUS	GRE	CAN	GER	NLD	AUT	SWE
1966	"Help Me Girl"	14	—	29	—	17	—	33	—	—	—	—
1967	"When I Was Young"	40	—	15	—	2	—	—	31	7	—	—
1967	"San Franciscan Nights"	7	—	9	—	5	—	1	20	6	—	—
1967	"Good Times"	20	—	—	—	—	—	—	—	—	—	—
1967	"Monterey"	—	—	15	—	4	—	3	—	35	—	17
1967	"Anything"	—	—	80	—	—	—	—	—	—	—	—
1968	"Sky Pilot"	40	—	14	—	9	—	7	—	—	—	—
1968	"White Houses"/"River Deep – Mountain High"	—	—	67	—	—	—	—	—	10	—	—
1968	"Year of the Guru"	—	—	—	—	—	—	—	—	—	—	—
1969	"Ring of Fire"	35	—	—	—	10	—	—	19	4	8	—
1970	"Spill the Wine"	—	—	3	2	3	—	4	28	9	—	—
1970	"Tobacco Road"	—	—	—	—	—	—	—	—	—	—	—
1971	"They Can't Take Away Our Music"	—	—	50	—	—	—	35	—	—	—	—
1971	"Home Cookin'"	—	—	108	—	—	—	—	—	—	—	—
1971	"Paint It, Black"	—	—	—	—	—	—	—	—	31	—	—
1971	"Soledad" (with Jimmy Witherspoon)	—	—	—	—	—	—	—	—	—	—	—
1974	"The Real Me"	—	—	—	—	—	—	—	—	—	—	—
1974	"Ring of Fire"	—	—	—	—	—	—	—	—	—	—	—
1976	"Magic Mountain"	—	—	—	—	—	—	—	—	—	—	—
1977	"Fire on the Sun"	—	—	—	—	—	—	—	—	—	—	—
1977	"Please Send Me Someone to Love"	—	—	—	—	—	—	—	—	—	—	—
1977	"Woman of the Rings"	—	—	—	—	—	10	—	—	—	—	—
1980	"Power Company"	—	—	—	—	—	—	—	—	—	15	—
1982	"Bird on the Beach"	—	—	—	—	—	—	—	—	—	—	—
1982	"Take It Easy"	—	—	—	—	—	—	—	—	—	—	—
1988	"Run for Your Life"	—	—	—	—	—	—	—	—	—	—	—
1988	"Don't Give a Damn"	—	—	—	—	—	—	—	—	—	—	—
1988	"I Used to Be an Animal"	—	—	—	—	—	—	—	—	—	—	—
1988	"Going Back to Memphis"	—	—	—	—	—	—	—	—	—	—	—
1988	"I Will Be with You Again"	—	—	—	—	—	—	—	—	—	—	—
1988	"Good Times"	—	—	—	—	—	—	—	53	—	—	—
1990	"Sixteen Tons"	—	—	—	—	—	—	—	—	—	—	—
1990	"We Gotta Get out of This Place" (with Katrina and the Waves)	—	85	—	—	—	—	—	—	—	—	—
1990	"No Man's Land" (with Tony Carey and Anne Haigis)	—	—	—	—	—	—	—	—	—	—	—
2004	"Once upon a Time"	—	—	—	—	—	—	—	—	—	—	—
2008	"For What It's Worth" (with Carl Carlton and Max Buskohl)	—	—	—	—	—	—	—	—	—	—	—
"—" denotes releases that did not chart.

== Collaborations ==
- "Verdammt wir müssen raus aus dem Dreck" and "Hoochie Coochie Man" on the live album Livehaftig by Udo Lindenberg in 1979.
- "Room with a View" on the album Coast to Coast by Paul Shaffer in 1989.
- "No Man's Land" with Tony Carey and Anne Haigis on Carey's album For You in 1989.
- "We Gotta Get out of This Place" with Katrina & The Waves for the TV series China Beach in 1990.
- "I'm Your Man" on the Mark Craney benefit album Something with a Pulse! in 1996.
- "Another Brick in the Wall" on the cover album British Rock Symphony with the British Rock Symphony Orchestra in 1999.
- "Power to the People" on the soundtrack album Steal This Movie! with Billy Preston on vocals and Ringo Starr on drums in 2000.
- "I Don't Live Today" and "Third Stone from the Sun/The Story of Life" on the Jimi Hendrix tribute album Blue Haze in 2000.
- "Someone Wrote 'Save me' On a Wall" on the album Joyous in the City of Lunatics (Χαρούμενοι στην πόλη των τρελλών) by Pyx Lax (Πυξ Λαξ) in 2003.
- "The House of the Rising Sun" and "Imagine" on the live compilation album Legends of Rock by Man Doki Soulmates in 2004.
- "For What It's Worth" with Carl Carlton and Max Buskohl on the album Songs for the Lost and Brave in 2008.
- "More Live to Live" on the album Aquarelle by Leslie Mándoki in 2009.

=== Concert films ===
- 1964: Live at Wembley
- 1973: Rock Concert (TV performance)
- 1976: Live at Rockpalast
- 1976: Live in Montreux (bootleg)
- 1982: Live at Rockpalast, Loreley (bootleg)
- 1983: Live at the Royal Albert Hall 1983 (bootleg)
- 1991: Live in Baden Baden (bootleg)
- 1991: Live in Tokyo (bootleg)
- 1991: Finally... Eric Burdon & The Animals (documentary)
- 1999: Live at the Coach House
- 2000: The Eric Burdon Band Live
- 2001: The British Invasion Returns (various artists)
- 2003: Yes, You Can Go Home
- 2004: Live at Rockpalast (TV broadcast)
- 2005: Live at San Sebastian
- 2006: Live at the Lugano Jazz Festival
- 2008: Live at the Ventura Beach California (with Robby Krieger and Friends)

=== Video Clips ===
- "Baby Let Me Take You Home" (1964)
- "House of the Rising Sun" (1965)
- "Don't Let Me Be Misunderstood" (1965)
- "When I Was Young" (1967)
- "San Franciscan Nights" (1967)
- "Monterey" (2 videos) (1968)
- "Poem by the Sea" (1968) (not broadcast)
- "Hollywood Woman" (1977) (not broadcast)
- "Tomb of the Unknown Singer" (1977) (not broadcast)
- "The Night" (1983)
- "Run For Your Life" (1989) (not broadcast)
- "We Gotta Get Out of This Place" (1990)
- "Sixteen Tons" (1990)
- "Once Upon A Time" (2005) (not broadcast)
- "The Secret" (2005) (not broadcast)
- "Highway 62" (2005) (not broadcast)
- "Devil Run" (2006) (not broadcast)

== Bootlegs ==
- Live at Olympia Stadium '64 '65 '66, Paris
- The Deluxe BBC Files
- Live at the Marquee Club 1967
- Ultimate Live Rarities 1965 - 68 (3CD set)
- Live at Ronnie Scott's 17.09 - 1970 (with War & Jimi Hendrix)
- Live at Offenbach, January 1971, Germany (with War)
- Live at Frost Amphitheatre, Palo Alto, 28 April 1971 (with War)
- Live at the Whiskey, L.A. 1971 (with Jimmy Witherspoon)
- Live in Homburg 1973
- When I Was Young at Denver 1974
- New York City 1975 (radio broadcast)
- Rockpalast 1976 (TV broadcast)
- Sartory Saal, Köln 1978
- Live in Holland 1978/79 (radio broadcast)
- Live at Vienna's first open air festival 1980 (with Fire Department)
- Live in Reggio, Milano, Italy 1980 (with Fire Department & Louisiana Red)
- Live at Frankfurt Jazz Festival 1980 (with Fire Department)
- Live at Rockpalast, Loreley 1982 (CD and DVD/VHS) (including a Jam session)
- Live at the Canary Club 1982
- Live in Poughkeepsie 1983 (with The Animals) (radio broadcast)
- Universal City 1983 (with The Animals)
- Live at the Royal Oak Theatre 1983 (with The Animals)
- Demos 1977 - 1983 (with The Animals)
- Rarest Masters (2CD)
- Rare Masters vol. 1
- Rare Masters vol. 2
- Live in Sevilla 1984
- Live at Westbury Music Fair 1986
- Live at Westfalenhalle Dortmund 1986
- Live at Capitol Mannheim 1986
- Unreleased Project #2
- Unreleased Project #3
- Unreleased Project #4
- Unreleased Masters and Alternative Takes
- Searching for a Brand New Day
- Live in Bremen 1988
- Live at San Diego Street Scene (with Robby Krieger)
- 1990 Detroit Tapes (with Robby Krieger)
- Live at the Caravan of Dreams (with Robby Krieger)
- Live at the Waters Club 1991 (with Brian Auger & Robby Krieger)
- Live in Cheiming, Germany 1992 (with Brian Auger Band)
- Live at Last Day Saloon San Francisco 1993 (with Brian Auger)
- Live at the Waterfront, Rockford 1995
- Live at der Filharmoniehalle, Darmstadt, April 1995
- Pasadena Live 1995
- Live at Abensberg 1996
- Live at Slims San Francisco 1998
- Live in Warszawa 1998 (radio broadcast)
- Live in Baltimore 1999
- Live at Studio 22, Australia, 2000 (radio broadcast)
- Live at Robin Two, Wolverhampton 2002
- Live at Boarding House, Lowell 2002
- Live at Waterfest Oshkosh Wisconsin 2003
- Live in Harelbeke 2003
- Live at Rockpalast, Kantine, Köln 2004 (TV broadcast)
- Live at the Jazz Cafè 2005
- Live 27.01. 2006
- Live at the Jazz Cafè 2006
- Live in Paris France 2006 (radio broadcast)
- Live at the Royal Albert Hall April 2008
- Live at Grand Prairie July 2008
- Daffodil Festival 2008
- Greek Theatre L.A. 2008
- Live in Toronto 2008
- Live in Philadelphia 2008
- Live at Clearwater August 2008
- Radar Festival 2009
- Live at the Fabrik Hamburg 2009
- Live at the Fairgrounds 2009
