= Wild & Wicked =

Compilation album by Eric Burdon
- Released: 2006
- Recorded: 1973–1982
- Genre: Hard rock, heavy metal
- Length: 77:00
- Label: AIM

Wild & Wicked is a 2006 compilation album by Eric Burdon.

Some tracks were taken from the unreleased "Mirage Project" from 1973. Other tracks are taken from the album Comeback and the film of the same title from 1981/82, a track recorded by The Eric Burdon Band in 1973, and a track probably recorded in 1971 but not released until 1988 on the compilation album Wicked Man.

The first nine tracks were credited to "Studio", the last eight tracks to "Live". This description is incorrect. Only some of the "Live" tracks are live recordings, some of them are still studio recordings, mainly from 1982.

AllMusic rated the album two stars and noted, "the live material has been out so many times that it's all but impossible to tell which label issued it first. Avoid."

== Track list ==
=== Studio ===
1. "Dragon Lady" (6:42)
2. "Cum" (2:48)
3. "Jim Crow" (4:54)
4. "Ghetto Child" (5:18)
5. "Mind Arc" (3:57)
6. "Jamie's Last Ride (Story of Jesus)" (8:32)
7. "Street Walker" (4:04) (Burdon)
8. "Stop What You're Doing" (5:01)
9. "River of Blood" (8:27)

=== Live ===
1. "Dey Won't" (3:10) (Newport)
2. "Do You Feel It" (3:32)
3. "Funky Fever" (3:00) (Ryan, Sterling)
4. "I'm A Wicked Man" (3:12)
5. "Sweet Blood Call" (4:28) (Red)
6. "The Royal Canal" (0:50)
7. "Wall of Silence" (4:13) (Burdon)
8. "Who Gives A #@$%" (4:43)

== Corrections ==
Track 7 ("Studio") was not recorded during any "Mirage Session". It was released on his "Comeback" album in 1982. Every other "Studio" track was recorded during the "Mirage Session".

Track 1 ("Live") is no live track and was recorded during the "Comeback" project.

Track 3 ("Live") is no live track and was recorded with The Eric Burdon Band in 1973 and was released on their last album Stop.

Track 4 ("Live") is no live track and was recorded during the "Comeback" project. It was released on Burdon's album Power Company in 1983.

Track 6 ("Live") is no live track and was recorded in 1971. It was first released on Burdon's compilation Wicked Man in 1988.

Track 7 ("Live") is no live track and was recorded during the "Comeback" project.
