= Wicked Man =

Compilation album by Eric Burdon
- Released: 1988
- Length: 39:32
- Label: GNP Crescendo
- Producer: John Sterling

Eric Burdon chronology
I Used To Be An Animal (1988)	Wicked Man (1988)	That's Live (1992)

Professional ratings
Review scores
Source	Rating
AllMusic	3/5 stars
The Encyclopedia of Popular Music	2/5 stars
MusicHound Rock: The Essential Album Guide	2/5 stars
The Rolling Stone Album Guide	3/5 stars

Wicked Man is a compilation album by Eric Burdon, released in 1988.

The studio and live tracks were recorded in 1981 during the Comeback project. The album was re-issued on 14 February 1994.

== Critical reception ==
The Rolling Stone Album Guide wrote: "A certain pathos attends [Burdon's] remake of the Animals' classic 'House of the Rising Sun'—that of a brilliant talent, lost and nearly forgotten."

== Track listing ==
1. "Sweet Blood Call" (4:35) (Kent Cooper, Iverson Minter)
2. "No More Elmore" (5:22)
3. "Do You Feel It" (3:30)
4. "Wicked Man" (3:10)
5. "The Road" (4:46)
6. "Devil's Daughter" (4:05) (Iverson Minter)
7. "Crawling King Snake" (2:19)
8. "Who Gives a Fuck" (4:43)
9. "House of the Rising Sun" (4:56)
10. "Comeback" (2:06)
