= White Lightning (band) =

American psychedelic rock band

White Lightning was an American psychedelic rock band, active from 1968 through 1971. The band was founded by guitarist Zippy Caplan and bassist Woody Woodrich. The band was very popular in Minnesota, mostly due to Caplan's fame playing with The Litter. The manager of radio station KDWB mistook the single "Of Paupers and Poets" for a song by Cream, giving valuable early airtime to the band. They also would perform a cover of the William Tell Overture.

"White Lightning" was on ATCO Records, a division of Atlantic Records.

Eventually, the band broke up due to musical differences, especially between Woodrich and Caplan.

== Band members ==
- Tom "Zippy" Caplan (lead guitar)
- Woody Woodrich (lead & bass guitars & vocals)
- Ronn Roberts (lead guitar & bass, vocals)
- Mick Stanhope (lead singer & drums)
- Bernie Pershey (drums, marimba, xylophone)
- Garr Johnson (drums)
- Russ Paul (guitar)
- Joey Boom Boom Winters (drums)
- Peter Dean Korellis (guitar)
- Ron Merchant (bass, keyboard)
- Dan Burniece (drums, vocals)
- Nickolas Jack Miller
- K Zakk Williams (guitar)

=== Line-ups ===
Mid 1968 (White Lightning)	1968 – 1969 (White Lightning)	1969 (White Lightning)	1969 (White Lightning)
Tom "Zippy" Caplan – guitars; Woody Woodrich – bass, vocals; Garr Johnson – drums, percussion	Tom "Zippy" Caplan – guitars; Woody Woodrich – bass, backing and lead vocals; Mick Stanhope – drums, lead vocals, percussion	Tom "Zippy" Caplan – guitars; Woody Woodrich – bass, vocals; Denny Craswell – drums, percussion	Tom "Zippy" Caplan – guitars; Woody Woodrich – bass, backing vocals; Mick Stanhope – drums, lead vocals, percussion; Ronn Roberts – guitars, backing vocals
1969 – 1970 (Lightning)	1970 (Lightning)	1970 – 1971 (Lightning)	1971 – 1972 (Lightning)
Tom "Zippy" Caplan – guitars; Woody Woodrich – bass; Mick Stanhope – lead vocals, percussion; Ronn Roberts – guitars, backing vocals; Bernie Pershey – drums, percussion	Tom "Zippy" Caplan – guitars; Woody Woodrich – bass; Mick Stanhope – lead vocals, percussion; Ronn Roberts – guitars, backing vocals; Rick Johnson – drums, percussion	Tom "Zippy" Caplan – guitars; Woody Woodrich – bass; Mick Stanhope – lead vocals, percussion; Rick Johnson – drums, percussion; Jeff Bouchier – guitars, backing vocals	Tom "Zippy" Caplan – guitars; Woody Woodrich – bass; Mick Stanhope – lead vocals, percussion; Ronn Roberts – guitars, backing vocals; Bernie Pershey – drums, percussion
1972 – 1973 (Lightning)	1973 – 1974 (White Lightning)	1974 – 1989	1989 – 1990 (Lightning)
Tom "Zippy" Caplan – guitars; Mick Stanhope – lead vocals, percussion; Ronn Roberts – guitars, backing vocals; Pat Donahue – bass; Dan Burniece – drums, percussion	Mick Stanhope – lead vocals, percussion; Ronn Roberts – guitars, backing vocals; Dan Burniece – drums, percussion; Russ Pahl – guitars, slide guitar; Ron Merchant – bass, backing vocals, keyboards	Disbanded	Tom "Zippy" Caplan – guitars; Woody Woodrich – bass; Johnny Elms – vocals; Denny Waite – keyboards, harmonica; Steve Fine – drums, percussion

== Discography ==
- Of Paupers & Poets (1968)
- Lightning (1970)
- Zachariah (Original Motion Picture Soundtrack) (1971)
- (Under the Screaming Double) Eagle (1995)
- The Lost Studio Album 1969 (1995)
- White Lightning Strikes Twice (1997)

== Filmography ==
Members of the band appear in the film Zachariah and perform on the movie soundtrack.

== Band members' whereabouts as of 2010 ==
Ronn Roberts toured with numerous acts in the 1970s and early 1980s, including Linda Ronstadt, David Bowie, The Righteous Brothers, Ike and Tina Turner, Jim Messina, John Mayall, Bread, James Taylor and The Beach Boys. He has formed two companies, Esoteric Pictures and Rave On Entertainment. He is married to the former Mary Catherine Percy and the couple have five daughters: Paris, Ashley, Regan, Ryanne and Taylor. In the summer of 2010, Roberts and Pat Robinson are at work on "Kidz That Rock (USA)", a concept for teaching music to children across the Los Angeles area.

Zip Caplan is recording another music project with his Ventures tribute band, The Surf Dogs, in Minneapolis.

Bernie Pershey has toured with Olivia Newton-John, Walter Trout, Edgar Winter and for eight years with The Animals/Eric Burdon. Currently he is in Norway with Eric Sardinas, playing gigs. Bernie & Eric et al., also played gigs with ZZ Top in Moscow and other parts of the world during their fall swing through Europe.

Mick Stanhope is married and living in Las Vegas.

== Sources ==
- Official The Litter, (White) Lightning Site
