= Soul of a Man (Eric Burdon album) =

Studio album by Eric Burdon
- Released: 13 January 2006
- Recorded: 2005
- Genre: Blues rock
- Label: SPV
- Producer: Tony Braunagel

Eric Burdon chronology
Athens Traffic Live (2005)	Soul of a Man (2006)	Untitled (2011)

Professional ratings
Review scores
Source	Rating
AllMusic	3.5/5 stars

Soul of a Man is a 2006 R&B album by Eric Burdon. It is dedicated to Ray Charles, John Lee Hooker and the city of New Orleans. It follows his 2004 comeback album My Secret Life and the 2005 live album & DVD Athens Traffic Live.

It reached No. 43 on the German and No. 165 on the French album chart.

The song "Feeling Blue" was written by Eric Bibb. "Slow Moving Train" is a song he first performed in early 2005, dedicated to U.S. president John F. Kennedy. Burdon also covered two songs by the folk singer-songwriter David Munyon; "GTO" features a bass solo and a spoken intro, and "Never Give Up Blues" takes a melancholy mood.

== Track listing ==
1. "Soul of a Man" (Blind Willie Johnson) – 4:16
2. "Kingsize Jones" (Jimmy Wood, J.J. Holliday) – 3:34
3. "Red Cross Store" (Fred McDowell) – 4:18
4. "Como Se Llama Mama" (Gregg Sutton, John Heron) – 3:39
5. "Forty Days and Forty Nights" (Bernard Roth)– 3:00
6. "Feeling Blue" (Eric Bibb, Fredrik Boström)– 4:48
7. "Never Give Up Blues" (David Munyon) – 4:13
8. "GTO" (David Munyon) – 5:33
9. "Forty-Four" (Roosevelt Sykes, Eurreal Wilford Montgomery)– 4:30
10. "Slow Moving Train" (John Keller) – 5:26
11. "Don't Ever Let Nobody Drag Your Spirit Down" (Charlotte Hoglund, Eric Bibb) – 4:55
12. "Devil Run" (John Bundrick) – 3:21
13. "I Don't Mind" (John Bundrick) – 5:27
14. "Circuit Rider" (Billy Watts, David Raven, Pete Anderson, Taras Prodaniuk) – 3:44

== Personnel ==
- Eric Burdon – vocals
- Carl Carlton – guitar, slide guitar
- Johnny Lee Schell – guitar, slide guitar, background vocals
- Jon Cleary – piano
- James "Hutch" Hutchinson – bass guitar
- Reggie McBride – bass guitar
- Les Lovett – trumpet, flugelhorn
- Nick Love – trombone
- John Sublett – saxophone
- Rod Piazza – harmonica
- Lenny Castro – percussion
- Tony Braunagel – drums
