= Meganck =

Meganck is a surname. Notable people with the surname include:

- Glenn Meganck, American novelist and composer
- Renier Meganck (baptised 1637–1690), Flemish painter and printmaker
- Bart Meganck (born 1968), Belgian athletics competitor
- Joseph Meganck (1807–1891), Belgian painter
- Liliane Meganck (born 1958), Belgian athletics competitor
