= Johnny Lee Schell =

American guitarist and songwriter

Johnny Lee Schell is an American guitarist and songwriter. In the late 1960s, he first recorded with producer Norman Petty in Group Axis. In the 1970s, he joined the Amarillo, Texas-based southern rock band, Baby. Since his professional debut, he has played with dozens of well-known recording artists. His inclusion on albums such as Bonnie Raitt's Green Light (1982) and Nick of Time (1989) has lent him his bearing in American pop music culture. Yet, Schell's works had already journeyed from North America to Australia, when he worked with Australian soul singer Renée Geyer on her album So Lucky (1981). As a member of Bonnie Raitt's road band, Schell backed the Australian Geyer while recording So Lucky (renamed Renee Geyer for international market) at Shangri La studios in Malibu, California. Other members included Ian McLagan (formerly of The Faces) and drummer/producer extraordinaire Ricky Fataar.

Some of Schell's 21st century interests have included working with Memphis-based Barbara Blue on her album, Memphis 3rd and Beale (2004), and recording Eric Burdon's albums My Secret Life (2004), Soul of a Man (2006), and co-producing The Voice's Season One semi-finalist, Nakia's EP with Barry Goldberg, in his own Ultratone Studios in Studio City, California. Schell was integral to Freight Train Love, the 2014 album of American singer-songwriter Hilary Scott, playing guitar as well as engineering and mixing. A collaborator with American actor/musician James Belushi, Schell worked as a music coordinator for the American TV sitcom According to Jim from 2005 to 2009.

In 2015, Schell played guitar on Karen Lovely's album Ten Miles of Bad Road. In 2016, Schell played guitar on Annika Chambers album, Wild & Free.
