= Ark (The Animals album) =

Studio album by the Animals
- Released: August 1983
- Recorded: 1983
- Studio: Country Lane Studios, Germering, Germany
- Genre: Rock, new wave, post-punk
- Length: 47:53
- Label: I.R.S. (U.K. & U.S.); Illegal (Europe); Epic (India); Castle (various U.K. & U.S. CD re-issues); Repertoire (2008 German CD re-issue)
- Producer: The Animals; Steve Lipson

The Animals chronology
| Before We Were So Rudely Interrupted (1977) | Ark (1983) | Greatest Hits Live (Rip It to Shreds) (1984) |

Singles from Ark
- 1. "The Night" Released: September 1983; 2. "Love Is for All Time" Released: November 1983

Professional ratings
Review scores
| Source | Rating |
|---|---|
| Allmusic | 2/5 stars |

Ark is an album by the original members of the Animals. Released in 1983 by I.R.S. Records, it peaked at #66 on the Billboard Top 200. Ark was the second and last reunion attempt of the band's initial lineup, and the album was subsequently followed by a tour by the band. It also serves as the last Animals studio album to date.

"The Night" was a moderate success in the US, reaching #48 on the Billboard Hot 100 and #34 on the Mainstream Rock Tracks. The single was followed by "Love Is for All Time". Both songs were written and recorded for an Eric Burdon solo album but held back once the reunion plans went further. A lot of the other songs were written by Burdon and his team. "No John No" was penned by Alan Price.

This album follows a recent trend of many veteran acts such as Fleetwood Mac, Stevie Nicks, Jackson Browne, Linda Ronstadt and Queen, where they either augmented their classic sound, or swapped it entirely, for a punk/new wave sound. The Animals were no exception with Ark displaying a prominent new wave/post-punk sound.

== Track listing ==
=== Side one ===
1. "Loose Change" (Steve Grant) (3:01)
2. "Love Is for All Time" (Eric Burdon, Danny Everitt, Terry Wilson) (4:23)
3. "My Favourite Enemy" (Steve Grant) (3:46)
4. "Prisoner of the Light" (Eric Burdon, John Henry Raskin, John Sterling) (4:09)
5. "Being There" (T. Gemwells) (3:29)
6. "Hard Times" (Eric Burdon, John Sterling) (2:55)

=== Side two ===
1. "The Night" (Eric Burdon, John Sterling, Don Evans) (3:55)
2. "Trying to Get You" (Rose Marie McCoy, Charlie Singleton) (4:16)
3. "Just Can't Get Enough" (Eric Burdon, John Sterling) (3:54)
4. "Melt Down" (Danny Everitt, Terry Wilson) (3:08)
5. "Gotta Get Back to You" (Danny Everitt, Terry Wilson) (2:42)
6. "Crystal Nights" (M. Anthony, Eric Burdon, M. Lewis, John Sterling) (4:12)
7. "No John No" (Alan Price) (4:18) (track on CD, but not on original album. B-side of "The Night")

With the exception of the CD bonus track, the songwriting credits shown above are as they appeared when the album was originally issued in 1983 (I.R.S. Records, SP-70037). When the album was re-issued in 2002 on compact disc (Castle Records, 06076-81172-2), the songwriting credits for Everitt, Wilson and Gemwells were removed. This left tracks 5, 10 and 11 ("Being There", "Melt Down" and "Gotta Get Back to You") with songwriting credits that simply read "Unidentified". It also left Burdon as the only credited songwriter for track 2 ("Love Is for All Time").

When the album was re-issued on the Repertoire label in 2008 the songwriting credits for "Melt Down", "Gotta Get Back To You" and "Being There" were restored.

The album was again re-issued as a burn-on-demand title by Amazon using the CD as the source in 2014. The artwork eliminated the booklet in favor of the song titles only.

== Personnel ==
The Animals

- Eric Burdon – vocals
- Hilton Valentine – guitar
- Alan Price – keyboards, background vocals
- Chas Chandler – bass, background vocals
- John Steel – drums

Additional personnel

- Zoot Money – keyboards
- Steve Grant – guitar, synthesizer, background vocals
- Steve Gregory – tenor saxophone, baritone saxophone
- Nippy Noya – percussion

== Production ==
Production is credited to all five band members. Co-production credit is given to Steve Lipson on tracks 2, 3, 4, 5, 7, 9, and 10. Engineering credit is given to Lipson for those tracks on which he is credited as a co-producer, and to Nic Rudrum for the other tracks.

- Jim Newport – design
- Eric Burdon – design concept
- Paul S. Power – cover illustration
