= 'Til Your River Runs Dry =

Studio album by Eric Burdon
- Released: 29 January 2013
- Genres: Blues; rock; rock 'n' roll
- Length: 54:58
- Label: ABKCO
- Producers: Eric Burdon, Tony Braunagel

Eric Burdon chronology
Mirage (2008)	'Til Your River Runs Dry (2013)

Professional ratings
Review scores
Source	Rating
Allmusic	4/5 stars
UNCUT	(8/10)
Rolling Stone	(not rated)
PopMatters	(7/10)
American Songwriter	(not rated)

'Til Your River Runs Dry is a 2013 album by Eric Burdon. It is his "first high-profile record in eons and his first album of largely original material since 2004", states Stephen Thomas Erlewine in his Allmusic review.

The album peaked number 168 on the Billboard 200, #15 on the Billboard Tastemakers and #57 on the German album chart.

== Track listing ==
1. "Water" (Eric Burdon, Dave Steen) – 4:20
2. "Memorial Day" (Tony Braunagel, Eric Burdon, Terry Wilson) – 4:39
3. "Devil And Jesus" (Eric Burdon, Gregg Sutton) – 4:22
4. "Wait" (Eric Burdon, Terry Wilson) – 3:45
5. "Old Habits Die Hard" (Eric Burdon, Tom Hambridge) – 4:00
6. "Bo Diddley Special" (Eric Burdon, Terry Wilson) – 5:29
7. "In The Ground" (Eric Burdon, Terry Wilson, Stuart Ziff) – 4:10
8. "27 Forever" (Eric Burdon, Terry Wilson) – 4:27
9. "River Is Rising" (Tony Braunagel, Eric Burdon, Jon Cleary) – 5:59
10. "Medicine Man" (Marc Cohn) – 4:39
11. "Invitation to the White House" (Eric Burdon) – 5:55
12. "Before You Accuse Me" (Bo Diddley) – 3:13

== Personnel ==
Musicians

- Eric Burdon – vocals
- Johnny Lee Schell – guitar
- Billy Watts – guitar
- Eric McFadden – guitar, mandolin, Spanish guitar
- Terry Wilson – bass
- Reggie McBride – bass
- Tony Braunagel – drums, percussion, background vocals
- Brannen Tempel – drums
- Wally Ingram – percussion, congas
- Lenny Castro – percussion
- Mike Finnigan – Hammond B3, piano
- Red Young – keyboards, Hammond B3
- Jim Pugh – keyboards, piano
- Jon Cleary – piano, guitar
- Darrell Leonard – trumpet
- Joe Sublett – sax
- Matt Perrine – tuba
- Crag Klein – trombone
- Shaamar Allen – trumpet
- Will Wheaton – background vocals
- Billy Valentine – background vocals
- Teresa James – background vocals
- Leslie Smith – vocal arrangement

Production

- Marianna Burdon – executive producer, photos
- Doug Sax with Eric Boulanger – mastering at The Mastering Lab www.themasteringlab.com
- Ed Cherney – mixing
- Christianna Proestou – cover design and layout
- Brian Fitzpatrick – art director
- Teri Landi – music production coordinator
- Michael Allen – marketing
- Danielle Boone – coordinator
