= Lost Within the Halls of Fame =

Studio album by Eric Burdon
- Released: 1995
- Genre: Rock, pop
- Length: 65:05
- Label: Sanctuary

Eric Burdon chronology
Access All Areas (1993)	Lost Within the Halls of Fame (1995)	Eric Burdon Live (1996)

Professional ratings
Review scores
Source	Rating
Allmusic	4/5 stars

Lost Within The Halls of Fame is a post-pop/rock album by Eric Burdon, released in 1995.

All songs came from the I Used To Be An Animal sessions in 1988. Some of the songs included on the album were released before.

The album was recorded with a concept, consisting of spoken parts and songs, because Burdon wanted to make an autobiographical album. I Used To Be An Animal should have been that album, but the record company wanted to only release the complete songs.

== Track listing ==
All tracks composed by Eric Burdon and Steve Grant; except where indicated

1. "I Used To Be An Animal" (Burdon, Geoff Bastow, Mick Jackson)
2. "The Dream"
3. "When We Were a Gang"
4. "American Dreams"
5. "Rock and Roll Shoes"
6. "Memories of Anna"
7. "New Orleans Rap"
8. "I Will Be With You Again"
9. "Brand New Day" (Steve Grant)
10. "Nightrider"
11. "Going Back to Memphis"
12. "Leo's Place"
13. "Woman's Touch"
14. "Is There Another World" (Steve Grant)
15. "Don't Shoot Me" (Steve Grant)
