= Carl Carlton (German musician) =

German musician (born 1955)

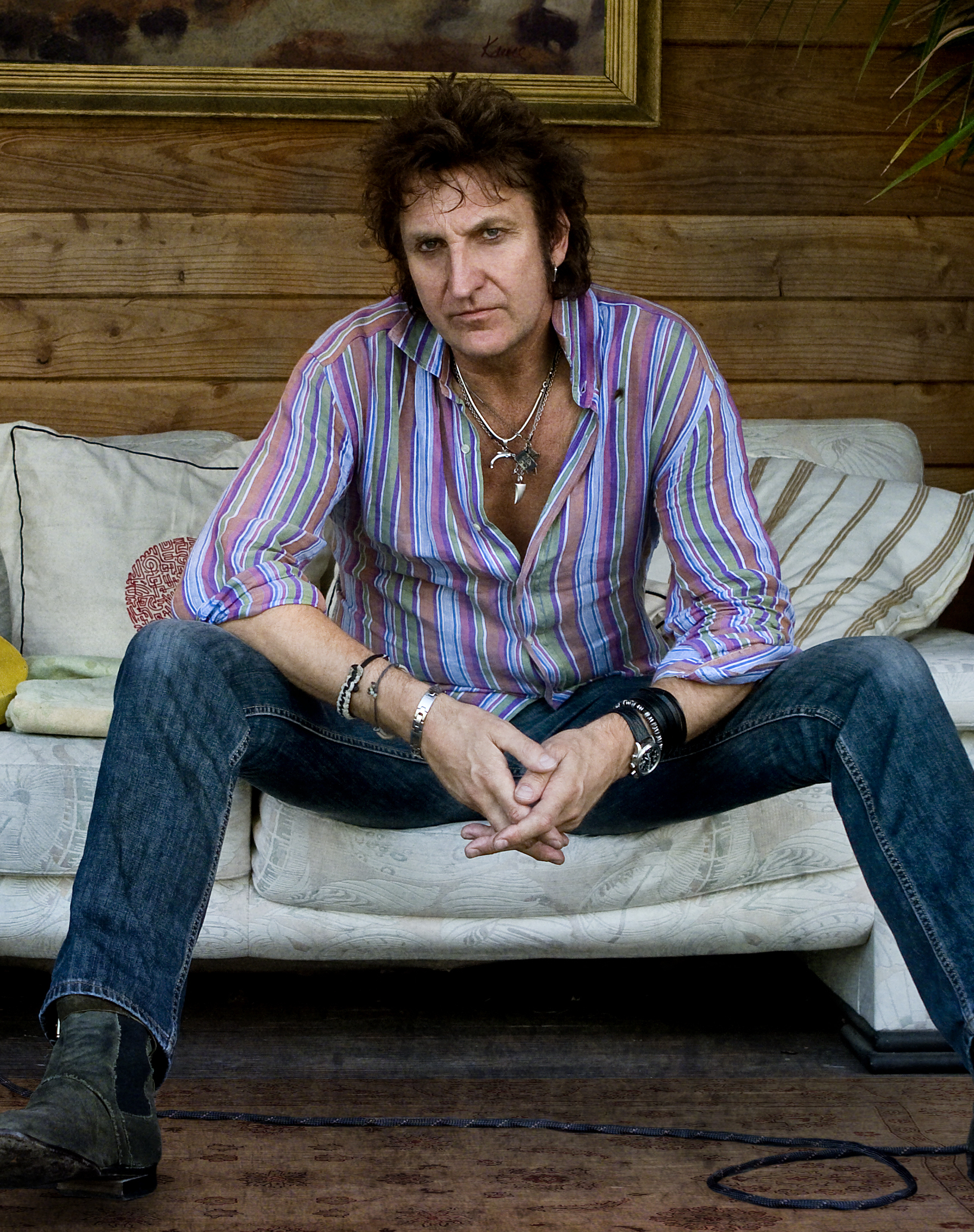
- Carlton in 2009

Background information
- Born: Karl Walter Ahlerich Buskohl; 20 April 1955 (age 71); Ihrhove, East Frisia, West Germany
- Genres: Rock, roots rock, blues, funk
- Occupations: Musician, singer-songwriter
- Instruments: Vocals, guitar
- Years active: 1967–present
- Label: STAAGES Music
- Formerly of: See below
- Website: www.carl-carlton.de (in German)

Carl Carlton (born Karl Walter Ahlerich Buskohl, 20 April 1955) is a German rock guitarist, composer and producer. His collaboration with Robert Palmer culminated in the Grammy-nominated album Drive, released in 2003. In 2005, Carlton joined Eric Burdon and the Animals. The collaboration resulted in the Grammy-nominated album Soul of a Man, released in 2006. Carlton has released five albums with his own band, Carl Carlton and the Songdogs and two solo albums.

== Early career ==
Carlton grew up on a farm in Northern Germany, leaving for the Netherlands at age 17. Starting in Groningen, Carlton played in numerous rock bands, including Herman Brood and his Wild Romance, Long Tall Ernie and the Shakers (with whom he recorded a gold record in 1977), and Vitesse. In 1979, he traveled across the Atlantic to become a guitarist for the band Mink DeVille. In the 1980s Carlton also played with Manfred Mann's Earth Band. Most notably at the time, Carlton performed as a guitarist, composer and producer for two of Germany's biggest rock stars, Peter Maffay and Udo Lindenberg, with whom he recorded thirteen and six albums, respectively. Of these, eleven singles topped the charts. During this period, Carlton married and had two children, Max and Jessica Buskohl (Max has since followed in his father's footsteps with his own band, Empty Trash EMI and a solo album Sidewalk Conversation - Universal.) At the end of the 1980s, Carlton began writing film and television scores, while, in addition, he played guitar for Joe Cocker, Keb Mo, Jimmy Barnes, Eric Burdon, Mother's Finest, Simple Minds and numerous other bands.

== Personal projects ==
In the early 1990s, Carlton and longtime musical partner Bertram Engel, a drummer, formed a band called New Legend, which also included keyboardist Pascal Kravetz and the two Dutch blues rockers Harry de Winter and Peter Bootsman. Two CDs were released before the band broke up two years later due to personality conflicts. In 1994, Carlton took up residence in Dublin, which at the time was one of the few pulsating metropolises for music in Europe. In 1999, Carlton again formed a band of his own, Carl Carlton and the Songdogs, which consisted of a multi-national line-up of musicians. In 2001, Carlton convinced Robert Palmer, with whom he had worked previously as a guitar player, to record a version of "Milk Cow's Calf Blues" with him as part of a tribute album to Robert Johnson. The resulting compilation, Hellhound on My Trail, was nominated for a Grammy. Its success convinced Palmer and Carlton to co-produce another pure blues album, the Grammy-nominated Drive, in 2003. Drive was also named one of Billboard's Top Ten Blues albums for that year.

== Carl Carlton and the Songdogs ==
The band's inner circle consists of Carlton, guitarist Moses Mo, bassist Wyzard (of the Atlanta funk group Mother's Finest), and Pascal Kravetz. Temporary Songdogs have included Sonny Landreth, keyboardist Ian McLagan, Levon Helm and Garth Hudson. The band's first album, Revolution Avenue, was recorded at Dockside Studios in Louisiana. A second LP called Love & Respect was released three years later. With more of an international membership than before, the band this time in addition to its core members consisted of Robert Palmer, Levon Helm, Sonny Landreth, Jon Smith, the White Trash Horns, Bobby Keys and Xavier Naidoo. Love & Respect was also recorded at Dockside Studios.

Martin Huch, a multi-instrumentalist, was soon hired along with Wayne P. Sheehy for live performances. At the end of the Love & Respect tour Carlton collapsed from exhaustion due to an unrelenting work schedule. The incident was caught live by television cameras. Several weeks later, in the midst of doing PR for the Drive album, Robert Palmer died suddenly. The next Songdogs album, Cahoots & Roots, was released in 2005. Also in 2005, Carlton joined Eric Burdon and The Animals and recorded a blues album called Soul of a Man with Ivan Neville, James "Hutch" Hutchinson, Ricky Fataar, and Mike Finnegan. It too was nominated for a Grammy. Carlton, who in the meantime had given up his second home in Mallorca and taken up residence on the island of Gozo near Malta, began making a fourth album called Songs for the Lost and Brave, whose fifteen tracks explored the many bitter blows dealt to Carlton in recent years, including a divorce from his second wife. By this time, Zack Alford, a drummer who had played for both Bruce Springsteen and David Bowie, had been added to the band, which was invited by Levon Helm, one of Carlton's closest friends, to record the new album at Helm's studio in Woodstock, New York. One of the album's tracks, a cover of Stephen Stills' "For What It's Worth", included the voices of Carlton's son, Max Buskohl, and Eric Burdon. Carlton and his son also joined together for a track on Klaus Voormann's album, A Sideman's Journey. In 2020 Carl Carlton and the Songdogs released a "Best Of album", a luxurious box set including an extensive booklet, four vinyl albums, a double CD, one vinyl 45", a hand signed poster and unique memorabilia.

== "Toast to Freedom" ==
In 2011, Carlton and Larry Campbell wrote "Toast to Freedom", a commemorative song to celebrate Amnesty International's 50th Anniversary. Carl Carlton & the Songdogs backed up more than 50 internationally renowned musicians, who contributed to the song in Levon Helm's studio The Barn in Woodstock, among them Kris Kristofferson, Warren Haynes, Donald Fagen, Keb Mo, Rosanne Cash, Carly Simon, Marianne Faithfull, Jimmy Barnes, Jane Birkin, Eric Burdon, Levon Helm and many others. "Toast to Freedom" was produced by Bob Clearmountain and released by Amnesty International on 3 May 2012.

== Associated acts ==
A selection of projects and bands for which Carlton has played guitar:

- Alannah Myles
- Amanda Marshall
- Busta Rhymes
- Carl Carlton & the Songdogs
- Damien Dempsey
- Ellen Foley
- Eric Burdon & the Animals
- Fun Lovin' Criminals
- Herman Brood & His Wild Romance
- Hollander
- Jimmy Barnes
- Joe Cocker
- Keb' Mo'
- Klaus Voormann
- Long Tall Ernie and the Shakers
- Manfred Mann's Earth Band
- Mink DeVille
- Mother's Finest
- New Legend
- Raiders of the Last Corvette
- Nina Hagen
- Paul Young
- Peter Maffay Band
- Robert Palmer
- Simple Minds
- Stephan Remmler & die Steher
- Tony Sarno's All-Americans
- Time Bandits
- Udo Lindenbergs Panik-Orchester
- Vitesse
- Wolfgang Niedeckens Leopardefell-Band
- Yah Yahs

== Production work ==
Carlton has been a producer for many artists and projects. These include:

- Madness
- Max Buskohl/Empty Trash
- Peter Maffay
- Robert Palmer
- Tabaluga & Lilli (musical)
- Tabaluga & the Magic Jadestone (musical)
- The Dead 60s
- Udo Lindenberg
- Yothu Yindi

== Discography ==
=== Carl Carlton & the Songdogs ===
==== Albums ====
- 2001: Revolution Avenue (also as an LP with two bonus tracks)
- 2003: Love & Respect (also as a digipak with one bonus track)
- 2004: CaHoots & Roots: Live from Planet Zod (live double CD)
- 2008: Songs for the Lost and Brave
- 2014: Lights Out In Wonderland(Solo Album)
- 2017: Woodstock & Wonderland (live Album)
- 2020: Lifelong Guarantee (Best Of... Box Set)

==== Singles ====
- 2001: "Coming Home"
- 2003: "Days of Magic"
- 2004: "Instant Karma"
- 2008: "For What It's Worth" (with Max Buskohl and Eric Burdon)
- 2012: "Toast To Freedom" Song for Amnesty International 50th anniversary feat. Levon Helm, Keb Mo, Taj Mahal, Ewan McGregor e.i.
- 2012: "King of the USA"
- 2014: "Moonlight in New York"
- 2019: "When the monkeys run the zoo"

=== Film scores and musical compositions ===
- Damals in der DDR (documentary film series)
- Lethal Obsession (director: Peter Patzak)
- Midnight Cop (director: Peter Patzak)
- Napoleon (documentary TV series)
- Neues vom Wixxer (film)
- Swansong: Story of Occi Byrne (film)
- Tabaluga & Lilli (musical)
- Tabaluga & the Magic Jadestone (musical)
