= Athens Traffic Live =

Live album by Eric Burdon And The Animals
- Released: 11 October 2005
- Recorded: March–April 2005
- Genre: Rock, R&B
- Label: SPV UK
- Producer: Dean Restum

Eric Burdon And The Animals chronology
Live in Seattle 2002 (2002)	Athens Traffic Live (2005)

Athens Traffic Live is a live album by Eric Burdon And The Animals, recorded in 2005 in Greece. It includes a bonus DVD.

== Track listing ==
1. "Introduction" – 0:16
2. "Boom Boom" (John Lee Hooker) – 5:57
3. "When I Was Young" (Eric Burdon) – 4:31
4. "Factory Girl" (Eric Burdon, Trad.) – 4:42
5. "Once Upon a Time" (Eric Burdon) – 4:00
6. "Devil Slide" (Eric Burdon) – 4:38
7. "Heaven" (David Byrne) – 4:49
8. "The Night" (Eric Burdon, Don Evans,) – 3:56
9. "In My Secret Life" (Leonard Cohen) – 6:02
10. "Over the Border" (David Munyon) – 4:35
11. "Little Queenie" (Chuck Berry) – 4:24
12. "Tobacco Road" (Eric Burdon, John D. Loudermilk) – 11:56
13. "Mercy's Hand" (Tom Hoeflich) – 5:08

== Personnel ==
- Eric Burdon - screamed and growled vocals, percussion
- Dean Restum - guitar, background vocals
- Martin Gerschwitz - keyboards, violin
- Dave Meros - bass
- Bernie Pershey - drums
