= Last Drive =

Studio album by Eric Burdon's Fire Dept.
- Released: 1980
- Label: Ariola
- Producer: Eric Burdon's Fire Dept., Crossfire Music

Eric Burdon chronology
Darkness Darkness (1980)	Last Drive (1980)	Comeback (1982)

Last Drive is the first and only studio album by Eric Burdon's Fire Dept., released in 1980.

== History ==
Every song title from the album is also listed on the front cover. Also some lyrics are visible on it, "Outlaw motorcycle gangs have joined forces with the citizen drivers, look out for hot Chevey panel truck" (from "The Last Drive") and "Take my spirit someplace else" (from "The Last Poet").

The front cover was drawn by Eric Burdon. The band's logo, visible on the back cover, was drawn by Gerd Grzelak. The album was recorded at the "Tonstudio", Hiltpoltstein, West Germany (April 1980) and at "La Playa", Frejus, France (June 1980). The inner sleeve photographs were taken by Jürgen V. Gzarnowski.

== Track listing ==
All lyrics composed by Eric V. Burdon; except where indicated
All music composed by Fire Dept. (Bernd Gärtig, Bertram Passmann, Frank Diez, Jackie Carter, Jean-Jacques Kravetz, Nippy Noya and Reginald Worthy)

1. "The Last Drive" (4:10)
2. "Power Company" (4:16)
3. "Bird on the Beach" (7:02)
4. "The Rubbing out of Long Hair" (2:46)
5. "Atom-Most-Fear" (4:17)
6. "Dry" (4:43)
7. "Female Terrorist" (6:47)
8. "The Last Poet" (Brendan Behan, Dominic Behan) (2:47)

== Personnel ==
=== Fire Department ===
- Eric Burdon - lead vocals
- Jackie Carter - vocals
- Frank Diez - guitar
- Bernd Gärtig - guitar, vocals
- Jean-Jacques Kravetz - keyboards
- Reginald Worthy - bass guitar
- Bertram Engel - drums, vocals, synthesizer, steel drums
- Nippy Noya - Afro percussion
