= Bernie Pershey =

American drummer and record producer

- Born: Bernard Pershey
- Genres: Rock, heavy metal, blues rock, country, folk, progressive rock, fusion
- Occupations: Musician, producer
- Instruments: Drums, percussion
- Years active: 1967-present
- Website: www.berniepershey.com

Bernard Pershey (born in Joliet, Illinois) is an American drummer and record producer.

== Biography ==
Pershey began playing drums at the age of eight. In his early years he was part of many psychedelic rock and hard rock bands such as Trilogy, White Lightning, This Oneness, Brainiac and Madame X.

During the 1970s and 1980s he was a session drummer for acts including Olivia Newton-John, Henry Gaffney, Chuck Berry, Michael Thompson, Jennifer Batten, Glenn Meganck, Dwight Twilley, Pat Vidas Flight and many others.

In 1988, he joined Edgar Winter for two years. His drumming on the song Frankenstein" is featured in the Tina Turner biopic What's Love Got to Do with It. In 1992, he joined blues Walter Trout's band for worldwide tours and nine albums, until he left in 2001 and joined Eric Burdon and replaced Aynsley Dunbar. From 2001 to 2005 he was a touring member of Burdon, incl. Dean Restum, Dave Meros (of Spock's Beard) and his old friend Martin Gerschwitz (who was also in Trout's band).

From 2002 to 2005, he was also a member of Beth Hart, which he left to play exclusive for Burdon, before Burdon parted ways with his band members soon after to form a new band. Pershey played on Hart's Leave The Light On album.

Between 2008 and 2010, Pershey performed with the blues musician Eric Sardinas and his band Eric Sardinas and Big Motor. The Eric Sardinas band is a three piece power blues outfit, with Sardinas on guitar, Levell Price on bass, and Pershey on drums. This line up had toured in support of the band's latest CD Eric Sardinas and Big Motor. Between 2010 and 2013, Pershey worked live with the jazz guitarist Bob Summers, and with Martin Gerschwitz and Friends, Keston and The Rhythm Killers, and others.

In 2016, he recorded with the singer Billy Trudel. Also in 2016 he recorded drums for the album The Streets Cry Freedom by Eddie St. James, which has been re-released on the Rivet/Sony-Orchard label. In 2017, he recorded drums for The Surf Dawgs, with Zip Caplan, on the record Beyond The Horizon, on Big Wave Records. He also played drums on a recording for Seth Phillips, produced by Tim Andersen. In 2020 and 2021, he did live performances with Iron Butterfly, and Uncle Zeek, although the schedule was curtailed by the Covid pandemic.

Pershey has produced music for the Chicago Producers Circle, and partnered Dean Restum at Mustang Brothers Productions, as well as recording drum tracks and client demos at the Bad Jack Studios in Arcadia, California, which he now owns. He also currently works with Cabin Fever, Keston and the Rhythm Killers, Bobby Gray, and others.
