= Live at the Ventura Beach California =

- Starring: Eric Burdon; Robby Krieger
- Music by: Eric Burdon; Robby Krieger
- Distributed by: ZYX Records
- Release date: 20 June 2008
- Running time: 60 minutes
- Language: English

Live at the Ventura Beach California is a concert of Eric Burdon with Robby Krieger and several other musicians.

In 1989, The Animals singer and The Doors guitarist had a conference together, called "The Rock 'n' Rolls Main Event". They started a tour.

Over the years, several bootlegs were circulating, notably one where Burdon's signature song was called Fucking House of the Rising Sun. They toured from 1990 to 1991 when organist Brian Auger joined the band. They soon toured as Eric Burdon - Brian Auger Band without Krieger.

On 20 June 2008, they released this concert on DVD.

On 26 April 2012, the album Live at the China Club, and more, containing live and demo recordings, was released.

== Set list ==
1. "CC Rider"
2. "Don't Bring Me Down"
3. "Back Door Man"
4. "Don't Let Me Be Misunderstood"
5. "Roadhouse Blues"
6. "Bring It On Home to Me"
7. "No More Elmore"
8. "The House of the Rising Sun"
9. "Louie Louie"
