= They Can't Take Away Our Music =

Single by Eric Burdon & War

from the album The Black Man's Burdon
- B-side: "Home Cookin'"
- Released: 1970
- Recorded: 1970
- Genre: R&B; funk; soul; gospel
- Length: 4:53 (single), 6:45 (album)
- Label: MGM
- Songwriters: War, Jerry Goldstein
- Producer: Jerry Goldstein

Eric Burdon & War singles chronology
"Paint It Black" (1971)	"They Can't Take Away Our Music" (1970)	"Magic Mountain" (1976)

"They Can't Take Away Our Music" is a song performed by Eric Burdon & War featuring Sharone Scott & The Beautiful New Born Children. It was released as a single in 1970. This was their last single before they split in the same year.

== Chart performance ==
"They Can't Take Away Our Music" charted #50 on the US Hot 100 chart, and #35 on the Canadian chart.

== Later versions ==
- It was subsequently recorded by several other artists with the most successful remake done by Donna Summer in 1994.
