= Audimax (University of Hamburg) =

Coordinates: 53°33′59.3″N 9°59′8″E

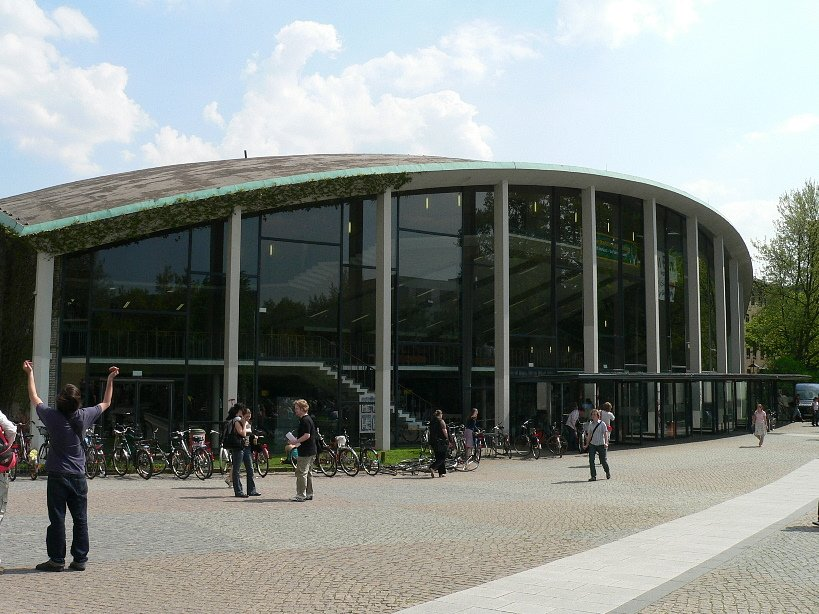
Audimax

The Audimax is a lecture hall located on the University of Hamburg campus in Rotherbaum, Hamburg, Germany, in the district of Eimsbüttel. It is the largest lecture hall in Hamburg. The 1,674-seat auditorium also hosts non-university events, such as concerts and cinema.

== History ==
Notable past performers include Van Halen, Black Sabbath, AC/DC, The Firm, Steve Hackett and B.B. King.
