= Max Buskohl =

German singer

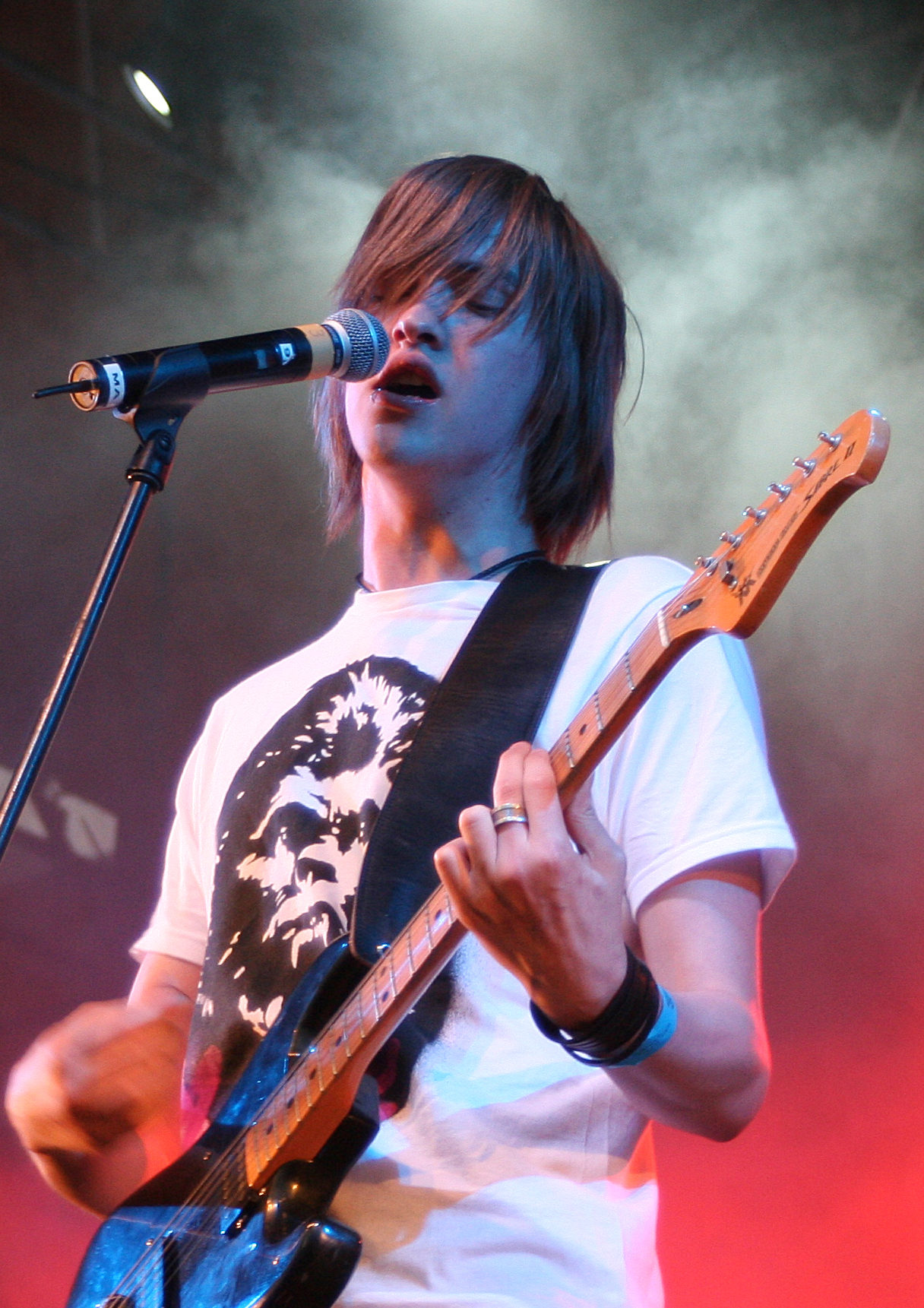
- Empty Trash (Max Buskohl) (2008)

Background information
- Born: Maximilian Söhnke Buskohl; 18 November 1988 (age 37); Berlin, Germany
- Occupation: Singer
- Years active: 2005–present
- Labels: EMI, Universal
- Website: www.facebook.com/maxandthechosenfew

Max Buskohl (born 18 November 1988) is a German singer who finished 4th in season 4 of Deutschland sucht den Superstar. Buskohl stated in an interview with Der Spiegel that he left DSDS voluntarily while RTL claims they threw out Max.

== Biography ==
=== Early life ===
Buskohl lives with his mother and sister in Berlin. Buskohl was part of a band called Empty Trash with his friend Stefan, who was the guitarist, and Julius, who played bass. Max's father is Carl Carlton. Buskohl lived in a boarding school in Ireland until 2006.

=== DSDS ===
Buskohl finished 4th in season 4. Buskohl auditioned for DSDS because he lost a bet. Max decided to leave the show after failing in an attempt to get his band, Empty Trash, included in the recording contract if he had won. Viewers had wondered about judge Dieter Bohlen's uncharacteristic behaviour when he gave an extremely critical review of Buskohl's performance on 21 April 2007. Buskohl is alleged to have said that Bohlen was asocial, which explains Bohlen's negative reaction. However, RTL stated that "We have made it clear that we are not looking for super-band, but a superstar". Buskohl decided to leave the show the Thursday prior to Top 4. Buskohl stated in an interview with Der Spiegel that he left DSDS voluntarily while RTL claims they threw out Buskohl. Bohlen claims that Max tried to "extort record company and the station". Buskohl participated in the Top 4 at RTL's request. Dieter Bohlen stated that "You may not give a shit what I say, so I do not give a damn what you're singing" during the Top 4. Martin Stosch, who was originally eliminated, replaced Buskohl in the show. Buskohl was considered a heartthrob on the show with his "super-slim" body and being 1.95 m (6 ft 5 in) tall.

==== Performances ====
Week	Theme	Original airdate	Song (Artist)	Percentage/ calls
1st Top 20 Show (Boys)	-	7 February 2007	Bad Day (Daniel Powter)	7,94% (5/9)
3rd Top 20 Show (Boys)	-	15 February 2007	Sweet Home Alabama (Lynyrd Skynyrd)	9,24% (5/8)
Top 10	Greatest Hits of All Time	24 February 2007	Fly Away (Lenny Kravitz)	6,00% (7/10)
Top 9	Greatest Hits of the 80s and 90s	10 March 2007	Gimme All Your Lovin' (ZZ Top)	8,92% (5/9)
Top 8	Power of Love	17 March 2007	Here Without You (3 Doors Down)	14,33% (3/8)
Top 7	Today's Hits	31 March 2007	This Love (Maroon 5)	11,75% (3/7)
Top 6	Big Band	7 April 2007	Hit the Road Jack (Ray Charles)	17,78% (2/6)
Top 5	Greatest Divas and Heroes of Music	14 April 2007	I Was Made for Lovin' You (Kiss)	19,88% (2/5)
Top 4	Hits of the 70s/Dedicated to	21 April 2007	All Right Now (Free)	19,80% (2/4)
Top 4	Hits of the 70s/Dedicated to	21 April 2007	When You Were Young (The Killers)	19,80% (2/4)

=== Post-DSDS ===
Buskohl needed emergency surgery on his right arm after being attacked. Surgery saved his arm. However, it was unclear if his ring finger would be saved.

RTL prevented Buskohl from performing on ProSieben. Deutschland sucht den Superstar candidates sign stricted contracts with RTL. Candidates must get permission to perform on other TV stations.

Since appearing on DSDS, Buskohl has come out with two singles. He came out with "Here Without You" in 2007 and "You're Sixteen" in 2009.

He also recorded a cover of "For What It's Worth" with his father Carl Carlton and Eric Burdon. His first solo album "Sidewalk Conversation" was released in late 2012. In 2013 he shared the stage with German singer Daniel Schuhmacher.

== Discography ==
=== Albums ===
Year	Title	Peak chart position		
Year	Title	GER	AT	CH
2012	"Sidewalk Conversation"	—		—

=== Singles ===
Year	Title	Peak chart position		
Year	Title	GER	AT	CH
2007	"Here Without You"	—		—
2009	"You're Sixteen"	—		—
2012	"No More Bad Days"	—		—
