= The Night (The Animals song) =

1983 single by the Animals

Single by the Animals

from the album Ark
- B-side: "No John No"
- Released: August 1983
- Genre: New wave
- Length: 3:55
- Label: I.R.S.
- Songwriters: Eric Burdon; John Sterling
- Producers: The Animals; Steve Lipson

The Animals singles chronology
"Many Rivers to Cross" (1977)	"The Night" (1983)	"Love Is For All Time" (1983)

"The Night" is a song by the Animals. It was released as the first single from their 1983 Ark reunion effort.

It is the band's first and only Billboard Hot 100 entry since 1968, peaking at No. 48. It is also their only entry on the Billboard Mainstream Rock, peaking at No. 34.

== Background ==
Eric Burdon wrote this song with John Sterling, who gave it to him after he wrote the initial music and lyrics about his wife Eva who was visiting her family in Sweden. John talked with her on the phone every night during her absence.

The video clip for MTV was shot on July 21, 1983. The complete line-up is featured there.

== Chart performance ==
Chart (1983)	Peak position
US Billboard Hot 100	48
US Billboard Top Rock Tracks	34
