= Survivor (Eric Burdon album) =

Studio album by Eric Burdon
- Released: 1978
- Studios: Advision, UK
- Labels: Polydor, Eric Burdon Grow Craft Music Ltd.
- Producer: Chas Chandler

Eric Burdon chronology
Love Is All Around (1976)	Survivor (1978)	Darkness Darkness (1980)

Professional ratings
Review scores
Source	Rating
AllMusic	2/5 stars
The Virgin Encyclopedia of the Blues	2/5 stars

Survivor is the debut solo album by English musician Eric Burdon, released in 1978.

Chas Chandler, Burdon's former bandmate in the Animals, produced the album. The album included a full sized booklet of ink drawings by Burdon illustrating some aspect of each song, accompanied by the song's lyrics.

It was recorded at Advision Studios, in London, England. Burdon reunited with Zoot Money to write songs for this album. His old friend Alexis Korner helped recording.

== Track listing ==
All songs written and composed by Eric Burdon and Zoot Money, except where noted.

1. "Rocky" (4:00)
2. "Woman of the Rings" (4:17)
3. "The Kid" (3:13)
4. "Tomb of the Unknown Singer" (4:27) (Jonnie Barnett, Shel Silverstein)
5. "Famous Flames" (4:16)
6. "Hollywood Woman" (3:53)
7. "Hook of Holland" (4:31)
8. "I Was Born to Live the Blues" (3:55) (Brownie McGhee)
9. "Highway Dealer" (3:26)
10. "P.O. Box 500" (4:39)

== Personnel ==
- Eric Burdon – lead vocals
- Zoot Money – keyboards
- John Bundrick – keyboards
- Jürgen Fritz – keyboards
- Alexis Korner – guitar
- Frank Diez – guitar
- Colin Pincott – guitar
- Geoff Whitehorn – guitar
- Ken Parry – guitar, vocals
- Dave Dover – bass guitar
- Steffi Stephan – bass guitar
- Alvin Taylor – drums
- Maggie Bell, P. P. Arnold, Vicki Brown – backing vocals
