= Power Company (song) =

Single by Eric Burdon
- B-side: "Dry"
- Released: 1980
- Recorded: 1980
- Songwriter: Eric Burdon

Eric Burdon singles chronology
"Woman of the Rings" (1977)	"Power Company" (1980)	"Bird on the Beach" (1982)

Power Company is a song written and performed by Eric Burdon. It was released in 1980.

== Background ==
The first version of the song was recorded with "Eric Burdon's Fire Dept." in April 1980 in France. It was released as a single and peaked No. 11 in Austria. In 1981, Burdon recorded a different rendition, released on the 1983 album Power Company.

In 1992 another version, recorded 1981, was released on The Unreleased Eric Burdon.
