= My Secret Life (Eric Burdon album) =

Studio album by Eric Burdon
- Released: 27 April 2004
- Genre: R&B; soul; blues; jazz
- Length: 57:02
- Label: SPV
- Producer: Tony Braunagel

Eric Burdon chronology
I Used To Be An Animal (1988)	My Secret Life (2004)	Athens Traffic Live (2005)

Professional ratings
Review scores
Source	Rating
AllMusic	4/5 stars

My Secret Life is an album by Eric Burdon released in 2004. It was his first solo album release, which contains new titles, in nearly 16 years. It was his comeback album.

It features many different musical directions, mainly R&B, soul, blues and jazz. The album peaked No. 93 on the German album chart after it sold 20,000 copies in the UK.

Musicians on this album include Red Young, Martin Gerschwitz, Terry Wilson and Jon Cleary.

== Track listing ==
Track	Song title	Written by	Time
1.	"Once Upon a Time"	Eric Burdon, Robert Bradley	3:51
2.	"Motorcycle Girl"	Eric Burdon, Marcelo Nova	3:52
3.	"Over the Border"	David Munyon	4:27
4.	"The Secret"	Greg Barnhill, Mike Chapman	5:47
5.	"Factory Girl"	Tony Braunagel, Eric Burdon	4:40
6.	"Highway 62"	Tony Braunagel, Eric Burdon, Johnny Lee Schell	5:29
7.	"Jazzman"	Eric Burdon, Dean Restum	3:47
8.	"Black and White World"	Eric Burdon, Marcelo Nova	3:28
9.	"Heaven"	David Byrne, Jerry Harrison	4:44
10.	"Devil Slide"	Eric Burdon, Marcelo Nova	3:35
11.	"Broken Records"	Eric Burdon	3:25
12.	"Can't Kill the Boogieman"	Eric Burdon	3:59
13.	My Secret Life	Leonard Cohen	5:51

== Personnel ==
- Tony Braunagel – percussion, drums
- Eric Burdon – vocals
- Lenny Castro – percussion
- Jon Cleary – piano
- Mike Finnigan – piano, Hammond organ
- Martin Gerschwitz – Hammond organ, electric piano
- Bob Glaub – bass guitar
- James "Hutch" Hutchinson – bass guitar
- Nick Lane – trombone
- Darrell Leonard – trumpet, flugelhorn, trombonium
- Reggie McBride – bass guitar
- Ivan Neville – piano, Hammond organ, background vocals, clavinet
- Eric Rigler – Uilleann pipes, Irish whistle, whistle
- Michito Sánchez – percussion
- Johnny Lee Schell – guitar, background vocals
- Joe Sublett – soprano sax, tenor sax
- Daniel Timms – Hammond organ, Hammond B3
- Tony B! – percussion
- Gromyko Collins – background vocals
- Valerie Davis – background vocals
- Julie Delgado – background vocals
- Billy Trudell – background vocals
- Teresa James – background vocals
- Marlena Jeter – background vocals
- Kudisan Kai – background vocals
- Terry Wilson – bass guitar
- Red Young – piano, strings, Hammond organ, electric piano

=== Production ===
- Tony Braunagel – producer, audio production
- Eric Burdon – executive producer
- Terry Becker – engineer
- Ed Cherney – mixing
- Jörg Kyas – photography
- Marita – photography
- Johnny Lee Schell – engineer
- Duane Seykora – engineer
