= Love Is All Around (album) =

Studio album by War featuring Eric Burdon
- Released: November 1976
- Recorded: 1969–70
- Length: 47:19
- Label: ABC
- Producer: Jerry Goldstein

War chronology
Greatest Hits (1976)	Love Is All Around (1976)	Platinum Jazz (1976)

Eric Burdon chronology
Stop (1975)	Love Is All Around (1976)	Survivor (1977)

Professional ratings
Review scores
Source	Rating
AllMusic	3/5 stars
The Rolling Stone Record Guide	2/5 stars

Love Is All Around is a studio album by Eric Burdon and War (credited as "War featuring Eric Burdon" on the original edition). Released in 1976 on ABC Records, it contains tracks recorded during the band's brief existence from 1969 to 1971, but not found on their two albums from 1970. Many years later it was reissued on CD by Avenue Records; this edition restores the original group name, Eric Burdon and War.

Only two tracks had been released previously: "Magic Mountain" was the B-side to "Spill the Wine"; and "Home Dream", though performed by Eric Burdon and War, appeared in 1971 on the album Guilty by Eric Burdon and Jimmy Witherspoon.

Of the remaining tracks, the title track had not been previously released in any form; "Tobacco Road" is an alternate and shorter version of the John D. Loudermilk song which appeared on Eric Burdon and War's first album, Eric Burdon Declares "War"; "A Day in the Life" is a previously unreleased cover version of the song by The Beatles; and "Paint It Black" is a live version (Whiskey, Los Angeles, September 8, 1969) of the group's suite arrangement of the song by The Rolling Stones which appeared in a studio version on Eric Burdon and War's second album, The Black-Man's Burdon.

In 1977, "Magic Mountain" and an edited version of "Home Dream" were issued as a single.

== Track listing ==
Tracks credited to "War" refer to Thomas Sylvester "Papa Dee" Allen, Harold Ray Brown, Eric Burdon, Morris "B.B." Dickerson, Lonnie Jordan, Charles W. Miller, Lee Oskar, and Howard E. Scott.

Side one

1. "Love Is All Around" (War) – 4:12
2. "Tobacco Road" (John D. Loudermilk) – 6:30
3. "Home Dream" (Burdon) – 7:15
4. "Magic Mountain" (War, Jerry Goldstein) – 4:18

Side two

1. "A Day in the Life" (John Lennon, Paul McCartney) – 11:05
2. "Paint It Black Medley" (Mick Jagger, Keith Richards) – 10:09

== Personnel ==
- Papa Dee Allen – conga, bongos, percussion, vocals
- Harold Brown – drums, percussion, vocals
- Eric Burdon – vocals, percussion
- B.B. Dickerson – bass, vocals
- Lonnie Jordan – organ, piano, vocals
- Charles Miller – tenor, baritone and alto saxophones, percussion, vocals, flute
- Lee Oskar – harmonica, percussion, vocals
- Howard Scott – guitar, vocals

Technical

- Jerry Goldstein, Lonnie Jordan, Howard Scott – producer
