= Darkness Darkness =

Studio album by Eric Burdon
- Released: March 1980
- Recorded: May 1978
- Studios: Ronnie Lane's Mobile Studio, County Laois, Ireland
- Label: Polydor
- Producer: Tony Meehan

Eric Burdon chronology
Survivor (1977)	Darkness Darkness (1980)	The Last Drive (1980)

Darkness Darkness is an album by the former vocalist from The Animals, Eric Burdon. It was recorded in May 1978 at Roundwood House, County Laois in Ireland, using Ronnie Lane's Mobile Studio. The album was released by Polydor in 1980. The line up for Darkness Darkness included Bobby Tench (Streetwalkers), Brian Robertson (Thin Lizzy, Motörhead), Henry McCullough (Wings) and Mick Weaver. The album was produced by Tony Meehan, who started his career as drummer with The Shadows.

== Track listing ==
1. "Darkness, Darkness" (Jesse Colin Young) (4:11)
2. "On the Horizon" (Jerry Leiber, Mike Stoller) (3.32)
3. "Rat Race" (Jerry Leiber, Mike Stoller, Van McCoy) (2.27)
4. "Gospel Singer" (Tony Joe White) (4:11)
5. "Ride On" (Angus Young, Malcolm Young, Bon Scott) (5:14)
6. "Baby What's Wrong" (Jimmy Reed) (3.09)
7. "Cry to Me" (Bert Russell) (3.12)
8. "So Much Love" (Gerry Goffin, Carole King) (3:12)
9. "Ecstasy" (Doc Pomus, Phil Spector) (2:27)
10. "Too Late" (Chuck Berry) (3.24)

== Personnel ==
- Eric Burdon – vocals
- Henry McCullough – guitar
- Brian Robertson – guitar
- Bobby Tench – guitar
- Mick Weaver – keyboards
- Chris Stewart – bass guitar
- Glenn Penniston – drums
- Mel Collins – saxophone
- John G. Perry & Friends – backing vocals

== References and further reading ==
- Burdon, Eric. I Used to Be an Animal, but I'm All Right Now. Faber and Faber, 1986. ISBN 0-571-13492-0.
- Burdon, Eric (with J. Marshall Craig). Don't Let Me Be Misunderstood: A Memoir. Thunder's Mouth Press, 2001. ISBN 1-56025-330-4.
