= That's Live =

That’s Live

Live album by Eric Burdon & Band
- Released: 1985 (Germany); 1992 (widespread)
- Recorded: 8 March 1985; Karlsruhe, Germany
- Genre: Rock, R&B
- Length: 60:38
- Label: In-Akustik (Germany)
- Producer: Alex Manninger

Eric Burdon & Band chronology
That’s Live (1985)	Access All Areas (1993)

That’s Live is a live album by Eric Burdon and his band, recorded live in Karlsruhe, Germany, on 8 March 1985, during a European tour. It was originally marked Limited Compact Disc Reference Edition in 1985, and achieved more widespread release in 1992.

That’s Live is the only recording made of this line-up which, during the immediately prior period of 1981-84, had been one of the first Western rock acts to play extensively in the Eastern Bloc, including pre-unification East Germany, where, according to bassist Rob Burns, the band were "treated like royalty".

== Track listing ==
1. "Intro" – 0:24
2. "Don’t Let Me Be Misunderstood" (Bennie Benjamin, Gloria Caldwell, Sol Marcus) – 6:24
3. "When I Was Young" (Eric Burdon, Vic Briggs, John Weider, Barry Jenkins, Danny McCulloch) – 7:41
4. "Working Life" [aka "Factory"] (Bruce Springsteen), featuring Robbie Burns, bass – 10:40
5. "We Got To Get Out Of This Place" (Barry Mann, Cynthia Weil) – 10:20
6. "Poor Man" (Woody Guthrie), featuring Tom Blades, guitar – 7:52
7. "River Deep, Mountain High" (Phil Spector) – 7:06
8. "I‘m Crying" (Eric Burdon, Alan Price), featuring Mitch Harwood, drums – 10:09
9. "Lawdy Miss Clawdy" (Lloyd Price) – 8:50

== Personnel ==
=== Performance ===
- Eric Burdon - vocals
- Tom Blades - keyboard and guitar
- Rob Burns - bass
- Mitch Harwood - drums

=== Production ===
- Alex Manninger - executive producer, cutting consultant
- Andre Ulmann - recording engineer
- Harald Hassler - technical assistant
- Dr. Benjamin Bernfeld - cutting engineer
- Günther Sümser - photos
- Bruno Kassel - cover photo
- wachner design/Freiberg - design
- Sanyo Electric/Japan - manufacturer
