= Anne Haigis =

German musician, singer and songwriter (born 1955)

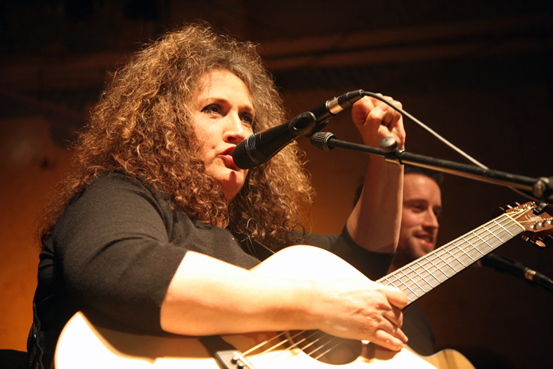
- Haigis in 2010
- Born: 9 December 1955 (age 70); Rottweil, West Germany (now Germany)
- Occupations: Singer; songwriter
- Years active: 1971–present
- Musical career
- Genres: new wave; rock; Blues; Jazz
- Labels: EMI Electrola; Ariola
- Website: anne-haigis.de

Anne Haigis (born 9 December 1955) is a German musician, singer and songwriter. Through the 1980s, she gained commercial success with rock songs, blues and ballads sung in German with her native Swabian accent. In the 1990s she incorporated English language material again, and recorded with Tony Carey and Eric Burdon. Her intense and passionate singing style has been praised as belonging to one of Germany's best contemporary voices, a "down to earth, charismatic, warm-hearted entertainer".

== Early life ==
Anne Haigis was born in Rottweil, Southern Germany, situated between Stuttgart and Lake Constance. Her father was an electromechanic and her mother was a master taylor. She learned to play the flute and joined a chamber orchestra. At the age of fourteen, she left the orchestra and taught herself basic guitar chords to accompany herself singing the "smalltown blues". In a Stuttgart music club, she met the rock band Foggy Day, who convinced Haigis to make singing a professional career. In 1971, she left school and her home in Rottweil for Stuttgart at age 16.

== Career ==
In 1974, aged 19, she changed to Interstate Roadshow, a band which mostly toured US soldiers' clubs. During the holiday seasons she sang with French musicians in restaurants, cafés and bars of St. Tropez. That year, she first performed with a jazz band. In 1981, Haigis released the acclaimed debut album For here where the life is, produced by her discoverer and later partner Wolfgang Dauner. She went on her first large tour and also accompanied the United Rock & Jazz Ensemble as a support act. In 1982, her second similarly successful album Fingernails was released. Aside from touring she was a guest singer with the Radio Jazz Group of Südfunk Stuttgart, was invited to NDR and Bayerischer Rundfunk radio productions as a soloist; she was a member of the Band Wolfhound by Wolfgang Schmidt, and can be heard on "Hallelujah" and "Neverending Story".

After separating from Wolfgang Dauner she changed from singing English jazz to German language music. Her first German language album was Anne Haigis (1984), produced by Edo Zanki with EMI Electrola. The title "Freundin" climbed the charts and became her first nationwide hit. She was a frequent guest on German TV shows with Hans-Joachim Kulenkampff, Rudi Carell, Thomas Gottschalk, Ohne Filter and others. In 1985, she released Lass mich fallen wie Schnee; in 1987 her most successful album to date, Geheime Zeichen produced by Tony Carey; and in 1989 Indigo, produced by Wolf Maahn and Mandy van Baaren, for which she received the Grammy of German pop music. She has called Indigo her personal favorite album.

In 1990, Haigis took a new direction by not singing exclusively in German any longer, and recorded No man's land with Tony Carey and Eric Burdon. With this she separated from EMI Records. She was supported by advisor-friend Peter Maffay, who helped her get a contract with BMG-Ariola. In 1992, she traveled to Los Angeles and Nashville to produce the album Cry Wolf, on which she collaborated with Kevin McCormick of the Melissa Etheridge Band, Barry Beckett and Nils Lofgren. During this time she met Melissa Etheridge, who wrote the songs "Dancing in the Fire" and "Out of My Mind" for her. With the release of Cry Wolf, Haigis went on a two-month tour through Europe with Curtis Stigers. Afterwards she trimmed her band from rock to acoustic players and sang unplugged.

In 1997, she played with Franz Benton, supported by Geiger Mani Neumann (Trio Farfarello) amongst others, the live album Dancing in the Fire at Club Bel Air in Cologne. Accompanied by Klaus Spangenberg, Jörg Hamers and Erich Strebel, she gave 200 concerts, including a short tour in Brasil. Back in Germany she developed her own style collaborating with "RE" and interpreted songs by Airto, Flora Purim, George Benson and Randy Crawford in her way.

In 1999, she fulfilled her dream of recording an album by herself at an unusual location, far from everyday life and the big city atmosphere; she rented a beach house on the Dutch North Sea coast installing a temporary studio for the production.

She was a guest singer on the "Tribute to Johnny Cash" tour, and since 2003 she has been a docent teacher in gospel workshops. In 2005, she produced the live album 8:00 pm together with her guitarist Jens Filser. In 2007, she produced the album Good day for the Blues after fans asked her to get back to the blues. In 2011, she toured Germany with her album wanderlust, which was widely praised in the press.

As of 2017 she continues to be well received when performing, on tour with the release of her 15th album, 15Companions.

== Personal life ==
Haigis said in a 2015 interview that she is "married to music", that it is her "highest priority", and that she does not really have time for a social life. She has two dogs.

== Awards ==
- 1987: Deutsche Phonoakademie in Jazz
- 1989: Löwen by Radio Luxemburg

== Discography ==
- Fore here where the life is (1981)
- Fingernails (1982)
- Truth (with Wolfgang Schmid, 1982)
- Anne Haigis (1984)
- Lass mich fallen wie Schnee (1985)
- Geheime Zeichen (1987)
- Indigo (1989)
- ...in deutsch (Best of-Album) (1989)
- Cry wolf (1992)
- Dancing in the fire (1997)
- [mi:] (2000)
- Homestory (2003)
- Das Beste in deutsch 2 (2004)
- 8:00 pm – im duo live (2005)
- Good day for the Blues (2007)
- Wanderlust (2011)
- 15 Companions (2015)

== See also ==
- Nina Hagen
