= Access All Areas (Eric Burdon & Brian Auger Band album) =

Live album by Eric Burdon & Brian Auger Band
- Released: 1 September 1993
- Recorded: 10 May 1993; The Belly Up Tavern, Solana Beach, California
- Genre: Blues rock, jazz fusion, progressive rock
- Label: SPV

Eric Burdon & Brian Auger Band chronology
That's Live (1992)	Access All Areas (1993)	Lost Within the Halls of Fame (1995)

Access All Areas is a live album by the Eric Burdon and Brian Auger Band recorded at the Belly Up Tavern, Solana Beach, California on 10 May 1993.

== History ==
When they first met in 1991, Auger asked Burdon if he wanted to play with him. Burdon agreed and they formed the "Eric Burdon – Brian Auger Band". After several tours they disbanded in 1994.

== Track listing ==
Disc one

1. "Introduction" – (0:11)
2. "Don't Bring Me Down" (Gerry Goffin, Carole King) – (4:09)
3. "Misunderstood Intro" – (1:55)
4. "Don't Let Me Be Misunderstood" (Bennie Benjamin, Sol Marcus) – (7:22)
5. "Monterey" (Barry Jenkins, Eric Burdon, Ian McCulloch, John Weider, Vic Briggs) – (6:34)
6. "We Gotta Get out of This Place" (Barry Mann, Cynthia Weil) – (13:11)
7. "I Just Wanna Make Love To You" (Willie Dixon) – (11:28)
8. "Roadhouse Blues" (Jim Morrison) – (8:35)
9. "When I Was Young" (Burdon, Weider, Briggs) – (5:18)
10. "It's My Life" (Carl D'Errico, Roger Atkins) – (3:50)
11. "Spill the Wine" (War – (10:38)

Disc two

1. "River Deep Mountain High" (Ellie Greenwich, Jeff Barry, Phil Spector) – (7:02)
2. "Bring It On Home To Me" (Sam Cooke) – (8:31)
3. "No More Elmore James" (Burdon) – (12:00)
4. "Band Intro For Eric" – (1:23)
5. "Tobacco Road" (John D. Loudermilk) – (11:57)
6. "Sky Pilot" (Jenkins, Burdon, Weider, Briggs) – (9:24)
7. "Rising Sun Guitar Intro" (Larry Wilkins) – (2:20)
8. "House of the Rising Sun" (Traditional; arranged by Burdon and Auger) – (8:49)
9. "Sixteen Tons" (Merle Travis) – (3:36)

== Personnel ==
- Eric Burdon – vocals
- Brian Auger – keyboards
- Dave Meros – bass, vocals
- Larry Wilkins – guitar, vocals
- Karma Auger – drums
- Richard Regueira – percussion
