= The Black-Man's Burdon =

Studio album by Eric Burdon and War
- Released: December 1970
- Recorded: 1970
- Studio: Wally Heider, San Francisco
- Genre: Funk rock; psychedelic funk; psychedelic rock
- Length: 90:08
- Label: MGM
- Producer: Jerry Goldstein

Eric Burdon chronology
Eric Burdon Declares "War" (1970)	The Black-Man's Burdon (1970)	Guilty (1971)

War chronology
Eric Burdon Declares "War" (1970)	The Black-Man's Burdon (1970)	War (1971)

Professional ratings
Review scores
Source	Rating
AllMusic	4/5 stars
The Village Voice	D+

The Black-Man's Burdon is the second studio album and first double album by American band Eric Burdon and War, released in December 1970 on MGM Records. It was the last album by the group before Burdon left and the remaining band continued as War.

The title is a pun on The Black Man's Burden, an expression which refers to black slavery, used as the title of a book by E. D. Morel (1920) in response to the poem, "The White Man's Burden" (1899) by Rudyard Kipling, which refers to (and champions) western imperialism (including its history of slavery).

The album includes two suites based on songs by other artists: "Paint It Black" by the Rolling Stones, and "Nights in White Satin" by the Moody Blues, augmented by additional sections composed by the group. (Two similar suites appeared on the group's first album.) The extra material is mostly instrumental, except for "P.C. 3" (P.C. referring to Police Constable, a common abbreviation used in the United Kingdom), a risqué poem recited (and probably written) by Burdon over the music. Two other songs include a gospel-style chorus credited as Sharon Scott and the Beautiful New Born Children of Southern California. Richie Unterberger of Allmusic says the album is "Composed mostly of sprawling psychedelic funk jams" and "it does find War mapping out much of the jazz/Latin/soul grooves...".

One single from the album was released: "They Can't Take Away Our Music" backed with "Home Cookin'".

== Cover art ==
Gatefold photo

The front cover shows a black man in silhouette, while the back cover shows Burdon and a woman posed together: the woman sitting on a wall with her legs spread far apart, and Burdon (shirtless) resting the back of his head against her pelvis and gripping her ankles. The gatefold photo is somewhat risqué, consisting of the group (mostly shirtless) in a field with two nude women lying in the grass.

The album also came with a numbered 7–inch by 3–inch "war bond" entitling the bearer to $1 off the admission of any War concert.

== Chart performance ==
The album debuted on Billboard magazine's Top LP's chart in the issue dated 26 December 1970, peaking at No. 82 during a nine-week run on the chart.

== Track listing ==
All tracks written by War (Papa Dee Allen, Harold Brown, Eric Burdon, B.B. Dickerson, Lonnie Jordan, Charles Miller, Lee Oskar, Howard E. Scott) except where noted.

Side one

1. "Paint It Black [Medley]" - 13:34
  1. "Black on Black in Black" – 2:05
  2. "Paint It Black I" (Jagger/Richards) – 2:05
  3. "Laurel and Hardy" – 1:30
  4. "Pintelo Negro II" (Jagger, Richards) – 1:05
  5. "P.C. 3" – 1:30
  6. "Black Bird" – 2:17
  7. "Paint It Black III" (Jagger, Richards) – 3:02
2. "Spirit" – 8:38

Side two

1. "Beautiful New Born Child" (War, Jerry Goldstein) – 5:07
2. "Nights in White Satin" (Justin Hayward) – 4:28
3. "The Bird and the Squirrel" – 2:43
4. "Nuts, Seeds and Life" – 4:01
5. "Out of Nowhere" – 3:22
6. "Nights in White Satin" (Hayward) – 2:51

Side three

1. "Sun / Moon" – 10:04
2. "Pretty Colors" – 6:52
3. "Gun" – 5:44
4. "Jimbo" – 4:50

Side four

1. "Bare Back Ride" – 7:07
2. "Home Cookin'" – 4:10
3. "They Can't Take Away Our Music" (War, Goldstein) – 6:45

== Personnel ==
- Eric Burdon – lead vocals
- Howard Scott – guitar, vocals
- Lonnie Jordan – organ, piano, vocals
- B.B. Dickerson – bass, vocal (bass misprinted as "brass" on cover)
- Lee Oskar – harmonica, vocals
- Charles Miller – tenor, baritone, alto saxophone, flute
- Sharon Scott and the Beautiful New Born Children of Southern California – vocals on "Beautiful New Born Child" and "They Can't Take Away Our Music"
- Harold Brown – drums
- Dee Allen – conga, percussion, vocals

Technical

- Jerry Goldstein – producer
- Chris Huston – engineer

== Charts ==
Chart (1970)	Peak position
US Billboard Top LPs	82
