= Power Company (album) =

Studio album by Eric Burdon Band
- Released: April 1983
- Recorded: 1981/82
- Genre: Rock, Hard rock, Heavy Metal, R&B
- Label: Teldec
- Producer: John Sterling, Snuffy Walden

Eric Burdon Band chronology
Comeback (1982)	Power Company (1983)	I Used to Be an Animal (1988)

Power Company is an album by the Eric Burdon Band, released in 1983. It features recordings from the 1982 semi-autobiographical film Comeback which starred Burdon, along with live recordings.

== Track listing ==
=== Side One ===
1. "Power Company" (Bernd Gärtig, Bertram Passmann, Eric Burdon, Frank Diez, Jackie Carter, Jean-Jacques Kravetz, Nippy Noya)
2. "Devil's Daughter" (Eric Burdon, Iverson Minter)
3. "You Can't Kill my Spirit" (Tony Greco, Ranji K. Bedi)
4. "Do You Feel It" (Eric Burdon, John Sterling, Pat Couchois)
5. "Wicked Man" (George Suranovich, John Sterling, Terry Ryan)

=== Side Two ===
1. "Heart Attack" (Chris Couchois, Howard Messer, Pat Couchois)
2. "Who Gives a Fuck" (Eric Burdon, John Sterling)
3. "Sweet Blood Call" (Iverson Minter)
4. "House of the Rising Sun" (Traditional; arranged by Eric Burdon and John Sterling)
5. "Comeback" (Traditional; arranged by Eric Burdon and John Sterling)

== Personnel ==
- Eric Burdon - sung, screamed and growled vocals
- John Sterling - guitar
- Snuffy Walden - guitar
- Steve Goldstein - keyboards
- Ronnie Barron - keyboards
- Terry Wilson - bass guitar
- Tony Braunagel - drums
