= Glenn Meganck =

American novelist

Glenn Meganck is an American novelist and composer. Born in Michigan, he currently resides in Florida. His most recent novel, George And The Angels, is a work of magic realism and fantasy. Besides his literary works, he has also published a number of genre novels, mostly in the mystery category, under the pseudonym J.R. Ripley. He has also written under other names through the years and has had some success at radio as well, particularly in the 80s within the college-alternative market. Some of his better known mysteries include: Murder In St. Barts, featuring Gendarme Charles Trenet; and the Tony Kozol series which includes the titles: Still In The Freezer, Skulls Of Sedona (featuring the crystal skulls, Lost In Austin, The Body From Ipanema and Bum Rap In Branson (which featured real-life celebrity/entertainer Jim Stafford as well as the Kewpie dolls of Rose O'Neill).

Sources include Florida Humanities Council, August 2004. News-Press Jan. 1, 2006, Mystery Readers Journal, Winter 1999-2000 and Fall 2003, Boca Raton News Dec. 9, 1998, Palm Beach Post Feb. 11, 2004, Springfield News Leader March 4, 2004.

== Further links and References ==
Mystery Writers of America , Jim Stafford, Authors Guild
