= Comeback (Eric Burdon album) =

Studio album by Eric Burdon
- Released: 1982
- Recorded: 1981 at City Recorders, John Thomas Studio and Polaris Sound
- Genre: Blues rock, Hard rock, Pop rock
- Length: 38:51
- Label: Line
- Producer: John Sterling, Snuffy Walden

Eric Burdon chronology
The Last Drive (1980)	Comeback (1982)	Power Company (1983)

Comeback is an album by Eric Burdon released in 1982, during the Comeback film project. It was the studio album to the film. Live tracks recorded during the sessions were released later on compilations.

It was re-released several times under the name Crawling King Snake and The Road. The Comeback Soundtrack (with studio and live tracks) was released in 1994.

== Track listing ==
1. "No More Elmore" (Eric Burdon, John Sterling) – 4:36
2. "The Road" (Eric Burdon, John Sterling) – 4:50
3. "Crawling King Snake" (Traditional; arranged by Eric Burdon) – 2:15
4. "Take It Easy" (Delbert McClinton) – 3:41
5. "Dey Won't" (James Newport, John Sterling) – 3:09
6. "Wall of Silence" (Eric Burdon, John Sterling) – 3:10
7. "Streetwalker" (Eric Burdon, John Sterling) – 3:12
8. "It Hurts Me Too" (Elmore James) – 4:49
9. "Lights Out" (Mac Rebennack, Seth David) – 1:45
10. "Bird on the Beach" (Bernd Gärtig, Bertram Passmann, Eric Burdon, Frank Diez, Jackie Carter, Jean-Jacques Kravetz, Nippy Noya) – 4:02

== Personnel ==
- Louisiana Red – guitars and vocals
- Joyce Angarola – vocals
- Ronnie Barron – keyboards
- Tony Braunagel – drums
- Honey Brown – vocals
- Eric Burdon – vocals
- Luis Cabaza – keyboards
- Lynn Carey – vocals
- Steve Goldstein – keyboards
- Kate Markowitz – vocals
- Bobby Martin – saxophone
- Bill McCubbin – bass guitar
- Debi Neal – vocals
- Carlton P. Sandercock – project co-ordinator
- Lisa Scott – vocals
- John Sterling – guitar
- Christian Thompson – design
- Tom Virgil – saxophone
- W.G. Snuffy Walden – guitar
- Terry Wilson – bass guitar
