= Comeback (1982 film) =

1982 semi-autobiographical film starring Eric Burdon directed by Christel Buschmann

- Directed by: Christel Buschmann
- Written by: Christel Buschmann
- Produced by: Christel Buschmann; Joachim von Vietinghoff
- Starring: Eric Burdon; Julie Carmen
- Cinematography: Frank Brühne
- Edited by: Jane Seitz
- Distributed by: CIC
- Release date: 1982
- Running time: 90 minutes
- Languages: English, German

Comeback is a 1982 semi-autobiographical film starring Eric Burdon of rock band The Animals and funk rock band War. It was shot first in Los Angeles then in Berlin. In spring 1984, MGM released the film on VHS.

A soundtrack to the movie was also released in 1982, Comeback.

== Premise ==
A once-famous blues singer whose career has taken a downturn tries to get back on top.

== Cast ==
- Eric Burdon as Rocco
- Julie Carmen as Tina
- Michael Cavanaugh as The Manager
- John Aprea as Lawyer
- Louisiana Red as "Louisiana"
- Jorg Pfennigwerth as Paul
- Blackie Dammett as "Heavy"
- Edwin Craig as "Freak"
- Emily Woods as Laura
- Bob Lockwood as Marilyn
- Rosa King as Rosa
- Blair Ashleigh as Liz
- Dan van Husen as Zuhaelter / Pimp
- Harry Hart-Browne as "Nada", Coffeeshop Counterman
