= I Used to Be an Animal =

Studio album by Eric Burdon
- Released: 1988
- Recorded: Indigo Ranch (Malibu)
- Genre: Rock; pop
- Label: Metronome
- Producer: Eric Burdon; Steve Grant; Carlo Nasi

Eric Burdon chronology
Power Company (1983)	I Used to Be an Animal (1988)	My Secret Life (2004)

Professional ratings
Review scores
Source	Rating
AllMusic	4/5 stars

I Used to Be an Animal is a studio album by the English singer Eric Burdon, released in 1988 by Metronome Records. It was his first studio album in almost four years. It was recorded at Indigo Ranch in Malibu, California.

Following his autobiography, I Used to Be an Animal, but I'm All Right Now (1986), it was his comeback. "Going Back to Memphis", "Run for Your Life", "Don't Give a Damn" and "I Will Be with You Again" were released as singles worldwide.

Burdon mixed several pop and rock-influenced styles like jungle, new wave, disco, alternative rock, hip hop, glam metal, electronica and blues.

== Track listing ==
All songs were composed by Eric Burdon and Steve Grant; except where noted.

Side A

1. "I Used to Be an Animal" (Geoff Bastow, Eric Burdon, Michael Jackson-Clark) – 3:19
2. "The Dream" (Burdon) – 1:33
3. "American Dreams" – 3:36
4. "Going Back to Memphis" – 4:12
5. "Leo's Place" – 4:07

Side B

6. "Run for Your Life" – 4:15
7. "Don't Give a Damn" (Eric Burdon, Michael Jackson-Clark, Amin Sabol) – 5:00
8. "Living in Fear" (Geoff Bastow, David John, Jackson Rich) – 4:24
9. "I Will Be With You Again" – 4:36

Bonus tracks

1. "Sixteen Tons
2. "New Orleans Rap"

== Personnel ==
Musicians

- Eric Burdon – vocals
- Chuck Findley – trumpet
- Andy Giddings – keyboards
- Jamie Glaser – guitar
- Anna Lena Karlsson – backing vocals
- Randy Kerber – piano
- Nick Lane – trombone
- John Liotine – trumpet
- Peter Michael – percussion
- Jamie Moses – guitar
- Adrian Shepard – drums
- Brad Silwood – alto saxophone, tenor saxophone
- Greg Smith – baritone saxophone
- Stephanie Spruill – backing vocals
- Steve Stroud – bass guitar
- Maxine Willard Waters – backing vocals
- Jimmy "Z" Zavala – harmonica, saxophone

Production

- Geoff Bastow – arranger
- Eric Burdon – producer
- Steve Grant – producer
- Chuck Johnson – engineer
- Richard Kaplan – engineer
- Carlo Nasi – producer
