= Eric Burdon =

English singer (born 1941)

- Burdon in 2013

Background information
- Born: Eric Victor Burdon; 11 May 1941 (age 85); Walker, Newcastle upon Tyne, England
- Genres: Rock; R&B; soul; funk; blues
- Occupations: Singer; songwriter
- Years active: 1960–present
- Labels: SPV; Polydor; Universal; Sony BMG; MGM; One Way; Repertoire Records; Avenue; Rhino; Line; Teldec; Flying Eye; Sanctuary; Columbia; EMI; Decca; Readymade Records; Lojinx
- Member of: Eric Burdon & the Animals
- Formerly of: The Animals; War; The Party Boys
- Website: ericburdon.com

Eric Victor Burdon (born 11 May 1941) is an English singer and songwriter. He was previously the lead vocalist of the original lineup of the R&B and rock band the Animals and the funk band War. He is currently the lead vocalist of the present day lineup of Eric Burdon & the Animals. Burdon is regarded as one of the British Invasion's most distinctive singers with his deep, powerful blues-rock voice and is known for his intense stage performances.

In 2008, he was ranked 57th in Rolling Stone's list of "The 100 Greatest Singers of All Time".

== Early life ==
Eric Burdon was born in 1941 in Walker, Newcastle upon Tyne, England. His father, Matt, was originally from Tyneside. His mother, René, was originally from Ireland and had moved to Scotland before settling in Newcastle in the 1930s. He had a younger sister, Irene. Burdon's middle name, Victor, resulted from a reward of £25 offered by the Lord Mayor of Newcastle upon Tyne to mothers who gave their newly born children suitably patriotic names.

Burdon was born to a working class family. Burdon describes his early school years as a "dark nightmare" that "should've been penned by Charles Dickens". Due to the river pollution and humidity in Newcastle he suffered asthma attacks daily. During primary school, he was "stuck at the rear of the classroom of around 40 to 50 kids and received constant harassment from kids and teachers alike." He goes on to say his primary school was "jammed between a slaughterhouse and a shipyard on the banks of the Tyne. Some teachers were sadistic – others pretended not to notice – and sexual molestation and regular corporal punishment with a leather strap was the order of the day."

At secondary school, a teacher by the name of Bertie Brown was responsible for getting him into Newcastle College of Art and Industrial Design (now part of Northumbria University) and changing his life forever. It was while studying graphics and photography at the college that he first met John Steel, the original drummer for the Animals. He also met a lot of other "young rebels" who shared his interest in jazz, folk, and movies.

Burdon started his young adult life as one of a group of people who hung out at a local jazz club, The Downbeat. He describes his friends as "like a motorcycle gang ... without the motorcycles" – they were tough, hard-drinking, and listened to American music. Burdon and fellow rocker and guitarist, American Jimi Hendrix, became very close friends in the mid-sixties and remained so up until Hendrix's death in 1970. Burdon was the person Hendrix's girlfriend called when she found him overdosed on drugs.

Burdon was a good friend of John Lennon. Burdon claims he was the eggman in one of Lennon's songs, "I Am the Walrus". Burdon states, "The nickname stuck after a wild experience I'd had at the time with a Jamaican girlfriend called Sylvia. I was up early one morning cooking breakfast, naked except for my socks, and she slid up beside me and slipped an amyl nitrite capsule under my nose. As the fumes set my brain alight and I slid to the kitchen floor, she reached to the counter and grabbed an egg, which she cracked into the pit of my belly. The white and yellow of the egg ran down my naked front and Sylvia began to show me one Jamaican trick after another. I shared the story with John at a party at a Mayfair flat one night with a handful of others." According to Burdon, Lennon, finding the story hilarious, replied, "Go on, go get it, Eggman", incorporating the incident into his song in tribute to the unique experience.

== Career ==
=== The Animals ===
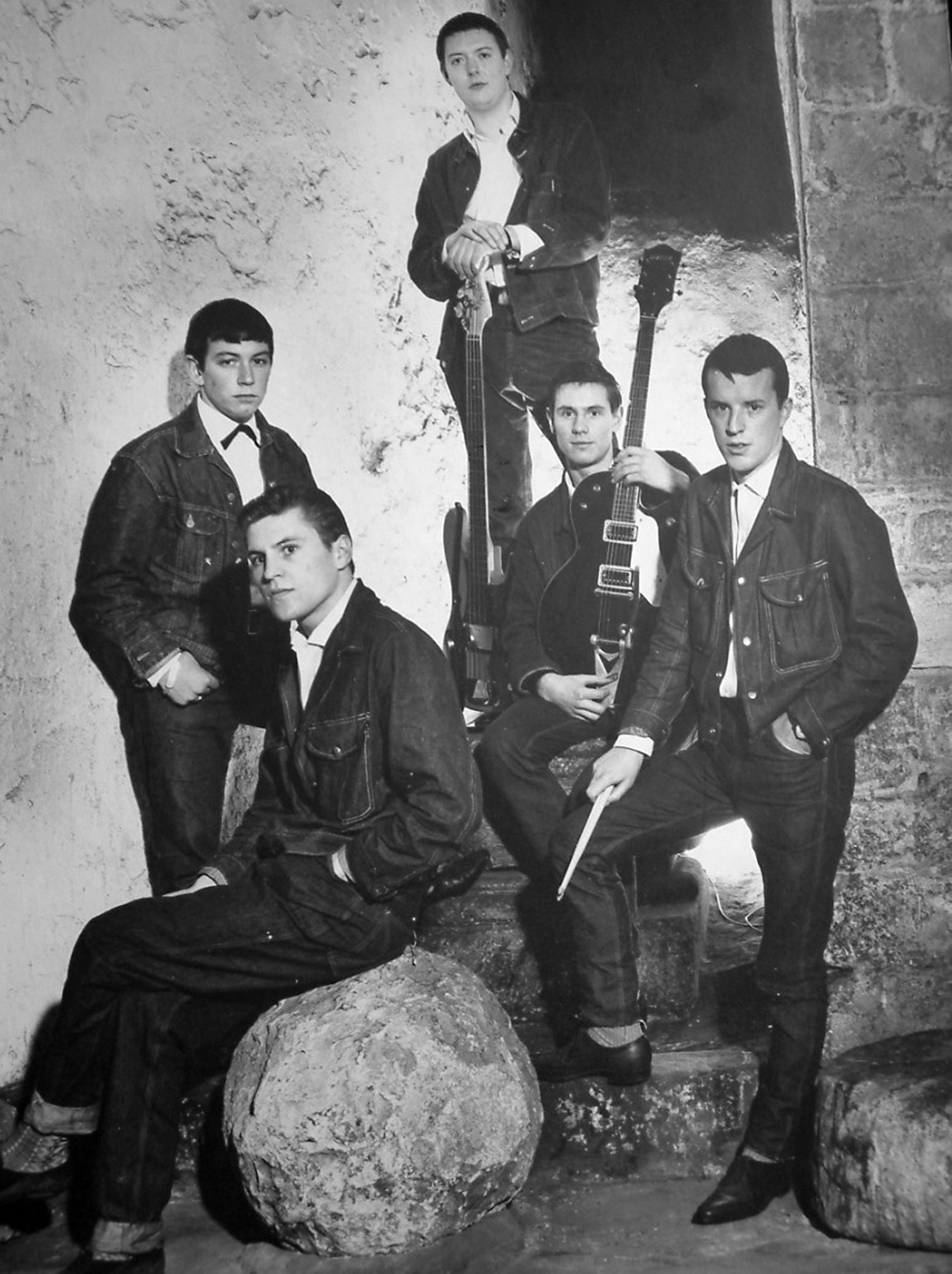
Eric Burdon with the rest of The Animals, 1964

Burdon was lead vocalist of the Animals, formed during 1962 in Newcastle upon Tyne. The original band was the Alan Price Rhythm and Blues Combo, which formed in 1958; they became the Animals shortly after Burdon joined the band. The Animals combined electric blues with rock; in the US they were considered one of the leading bands of the British Invasion. Along with the Beatles, the Rolling Stones, the Who, the Hollies, the Dave Clark Five, and the Kinks, the group introduced contemporary British music and fashion to American audiences. Burdon's powerful voice can be heard on the Animals' singles "The House of the Rising Sun", "Baby Let Me Take You Home", "I'm Crying", "Boom Boom", "Don't Let Me Be Misunderstood", "Bring It On Home to Me", "We Gotta Get Out of This Place", "It's My Life", "Don't Bring Me Down", "Inside-Looking Out," "See See Rider", "Help Me Girl", "Monterey", and "Sky Pilot".

The Animals' keyboardist Alan Price left the band in May 1965, and drummer John Steel followed in April 1966. Burdon has often attributed the disintegration of the band to conflict with Price, specifically that Price had claimed sole rights and ownership to "House of the Rising Sun". Burdon and drummer Barry Jenkins reformed the group as Eric Burdon and the Animals. Their first studio album was Eric Is Here, which featured the hit single "Help Me Girl", released in December 1966, in which Burdon and drummer Jenkins teamed up with Animals' keyboardist Dave Rowberry, Animals' original bassist Chas Chandler, and Animals' original guitarist Hilton Valentine, and session musicians arranged and conducted by Horace Ott.

Then followed a more psychedelic incarnation of the group that featured future Family member John Weider and was sometimes called Eric Burdon and the New Animals. Keyboardist Zoot Money joined during 1968 until the band broke up in 1969. This group's hits included the ballad "San Franciscan Nights", the grunge–heavy metal-pioneering "When I Was Young", "Monterey", the anti-Vietnam-war anthem "Sky Pilot", "White Houses" and the progressive cover of "Ring of Fire".

In 1975, the original Animals reunited and recorded a studio album called Before We Were So Rudely Interrupted, released in 1977. In May 1983, the Animals reunited with their original line-up and released the studio album Ark on 16 June 1983, along with the singles "The Night" and "Love Is for All Time". A world tour followed, and the concert at Wembley Arena, London, recorded on 31 December 1983, was released in 1984 as Greatest Hits Live (Rip It to Shreds). Their concert at the Royal Oak Theatre in April 1984 was released in 2008 as Last Live Show; the band members were augmented by Zoot Money, Nippy Noya, Steve Gregory and Steve Grant. The original Animals broke up for the last time at the end of 1984.

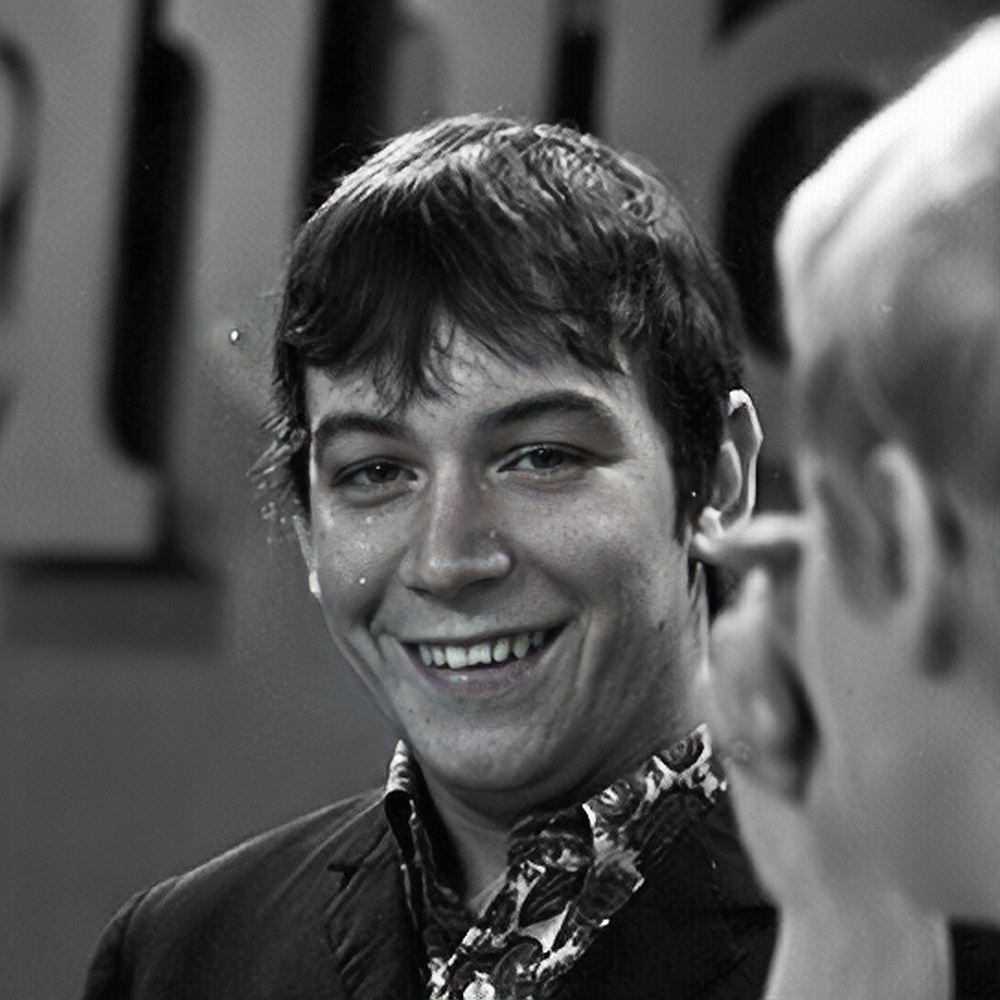
Eric Burdon on the Dutch TV programme FanClub on 7 January 1967

Although the band Burdon formed in the late 1960s was sometimes called Eric Burdon and the New Animals, it was not until 1998 that the name Eric Burdon and the New Animals was officially adopted. The 1998 band had bassist Dave Meros, guitarist Dean Restum, drummer Aynsley Dunbar and keyboard guitarist Neal Morse. They recorded Live at the Coach House on 17 October 1998, released on video and DVD in December that year. In 1999 they released The Official Live Bootleg No. 2 and in August 2000 The Official Live Bootleg 2000, with Martin Gerschwitz on keyboards.

In June 2003, he formed another Eric Burdon and the Animals, with keyboardist Martin Gerschwitz, bassist Dave Meros, guitarist Dean Restum, and drummer Bernie Pershey. They broke up in 2005. During 2008 Burdon toured again as Eric Burdon and the Animals with a variable line-up of backing musicians.

On 13 December 2008 Burdon lost a three-year legal battle to use the name "the Animals" in the UK, with drummer John Steel owning the rights, in the UK only, as a result. Steel was a member in the band's heyday and left in 1966, before the band broke up three years later; he later played in various reunion versions of the band with Burdon. Burdon still toured as Eric Burdon and the Animals, but was prevented from using the name "the Animals" in Britain while the case was under appeal. On 9 September 2013 Burdon's appeal was allowed, with him then entitled to use the band name in the UK.

In 2016, Burdon formed the current line-up of the Animals, including Johnzo West (guitar and vocals), Davey Allen (keyboards and vocals), Dustin Koester (drums and vocals), Justin Andres (bass guitar and vocals), Ruben Salinas (saxophone and flute), and Evan Mackey (trombone).

=== War ===
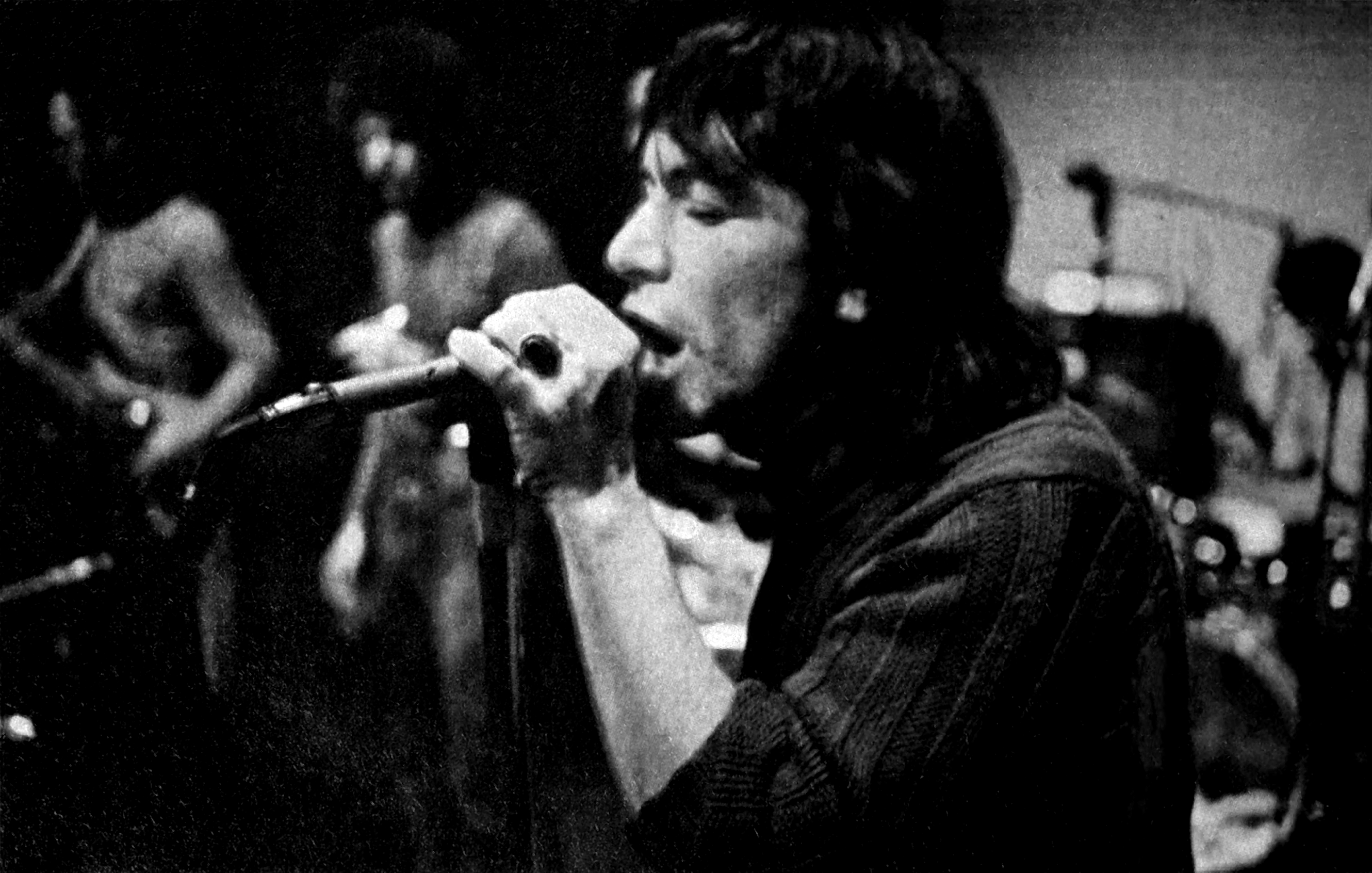
Burdon performing with War, c. 1971

In 1969, while living in San Francisco, Burdon joined forces with California funk rock band War. In April 1970, the resulting studio album was titled Eric Burdon Declares "War" which produced the singles "Spill the Wine" and "Tobacco Road". A two-disc set entitled The Black-Man's Burdon was released in September 1970. The singles from their double album, "Paint It Black" and "They Can't Take Away Our Music", had moderate success during 1971. During this time Burdon collapsed on the stage during a concert, caused by an asthma attack, and War continued the tour without him.

In 1976, a compilation album, Love Is All Around, released by ABC Records, included recordings of Eric Burdon with War doing a live version of "Paint It Black" and a cover of the Beatles' song "A Day in the Life".

Eric Burdon and War were reunited for the first time in 37 years, to perform an Eric Burdon & War reunion at the concert at the Royal Albert Hall London on 21 April 2008. The concert coincided with a major reissue campaign by Rhino Records (UK), which released all the War albums including Eric Burdon Declares "War" and The Black-Man's Burdon.

The version of the band that performed alongside Burdon in 2008 at the Royal Albert Hall was not the original band but a reformed one led by the only original member, keyboardist Lonnie Jordan. This was due to a court injunction. The remaining surviving members of WAR perform as "The LowRider Band".

=== Solo career ===
Burdon began a solo career in 1971 with the Eric Burdon Band, continuing with a hard rock–heavy metal–funk style. In August 1971, he recorded the studio album Guilty!, which featured the blues shouter Jimmy Witherspoon and Ike White of the San Quentin Prison Band. In 1973, the band performed at the Reading Festival. At the end of 1974, the band released the album Sun Secrets followed by the album Stop in 1975. Burdon moved to Germany in 1977 and recorded the album Survivor with a line-up including guitarist Alexis Korner and keyboardist Zoot Money; the album also had a line-up of four guitarists and three keyboardists and is known for its interesting album cover, which depicts Burdon screaming. The album was produced by former Animals bassist Chas Chandler. The original release included a booklet of illustrated lyrics done in ink by Burdon himself.

In May 1978, he recorded the studio album Darkness Darkness at the Roundwood House in County Laois, Ireland, using Ronnie Lane's Mobile Studio and featuring guitarist and vocalist Bobby Tench from the Jeff Beck Group, who had left Streetwalkers a few months before. The album was eventually released in 1980. During January 1979, Burdon changed his band for a tour taking in Hamburg, Germany and the Netherlands.

On 28 August 1982, the "Eric Burdon Band" including Red Young (keyboards) performed at the Rockpalast Open Air Concert at the Freilichtbühne Loreley, Germany. Following this Burdon toured heavily with his solo project from March 1984 to March 1985, taking in UK, Spain, Germany, Sweden, Canada and Australia. In 1986, Burdon published his autobiography titled I Used to Be an Animal, but I'm Alright Now.

In March 1979, he played a concert in Cologne and changed the band's name to Eric Burdon's Fire Department, whose line-up included backing vocalist Jackie Carter of Silver Convention, Bertram Engel of Udo Lindenberg's "Panik Orchester" and Jean-Jaques Kravetz. In mid 1980, they recorded the album The Last Drive. "Eric Burdon's Fire Department" toured Europe with this line-up and Paul Millns and Louisiana Red made special appearances in Spain and Italy. By December 1980, the band had broken up.

In April 1981, Christel Buschmann began to film Comeback with Burdon as the star. They created a new Eric Burdon Band whose line-up included Louisiana Red, Tony Braunagle, John Sterling and Snuffy Walden. This band recorded live tracks in Los Angeles. They also recorded in Berlin with another line-up, the only remaining member being John Sterling. In September 1981, the final scenes of Comeback were shot in the Metropol Berlin and Burdon and his band continued to tour through Australia and North America. A studio album titled Comeback was released in 1982. The 1983 album Power Company also included songs recorded during the Comeback project.

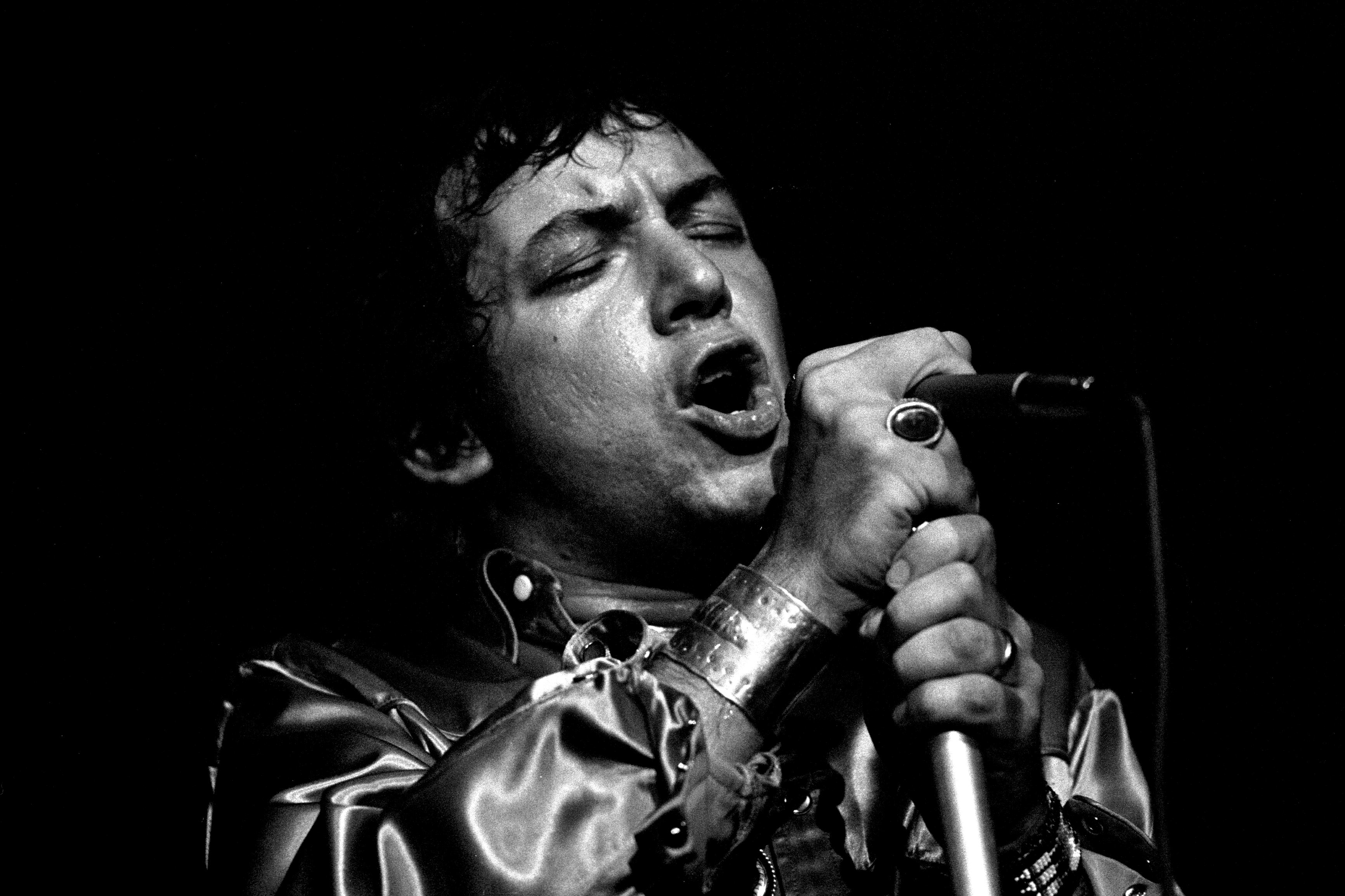
Burdon at the Audimax in Hamburg, with the Eric Burdon Band, July 1973

In 1988, he put together a band with 15 musicians including Andrew Giddings – keyboards, Steve Stroud – bass, Adrian Sheppard – drums, Jamie Moses – guitar and four backing vocalists to record the studio album I Used to Be an Animal in Malibu, in the United States. In 1990, Eric Burdon's cover version of "Sixteen Tons" was used for the film Joe Versus the Volcano. The song, which played at the beginning of the film, was also released as a single. He also recorded the singles "We Gotta Get out of this Place" with Katrina and the Waves and "No Man's Land" with Tony Carey and Anne Haigis. Later in 1990, he had a small line-up of an Eric Burdon Band featuring Jimmy Zavala (saxophone and harmonica), Dave Meros (bass guitar), Jeff Naideau (keyboards), Thom Mooney (drums) and John Sterling (guitar) before he began a tour with the Doors guitarist Robby Krieger and they appeared at a concert from Ventura Beach, California, which was released as a DVD on 20 June 2008.

On 13 April 2004, he released a "comeback" album, My Secret Life, which was his first album with new recordings for 16 years. When John Lee Hooker died in 2001, Burdon had written the song "Can't Kill the Boogieman" the co-writers of the songs, on the album, were Tony Braunagel and Marcelo Nova. In 2005, they released a live album, Athens Traffic Live, with special DVD bonus material and a bonus studio track and disbanded in November 2005. He began a short touring as the "Blues Knights".

On 27 January 2006, he released his blues–R&B album Soul of a Man. This album was dedicated to Ray Charles and John Lee Hooker. The cover of the album was a picture which was sent to Burdon a few years before. Burdon then formed a new band, with the following members: Red Young (keyboards), Paula O'Rourke (bass), Eric McFadden (guitar), Carl Carlton (guitar) and Wally Ingram (drums). They also performed at the Lugano Festival and in 2007 he toured as the headlining act of the "Hippiefest" line-up, produced and hosted by Country Joe McDonald.

Burdon, at 71, recorded an EP with Cincinnati garage band the Greenhornes called, simply, Eric Burdon & the Greenhornes. The album was recorded at an all-analogue recording studio, and released on 23 November 2012 as part of Record Store Day's "Black Friday".

In 2013, Eric Burdon came out with a new album called, Til Your River Runs Dry. The lead single off the album was called "Water" and was inspired by a conversation he had with former Soviet General Secretary Mikhail Gorbachev.

=== Other associations ===
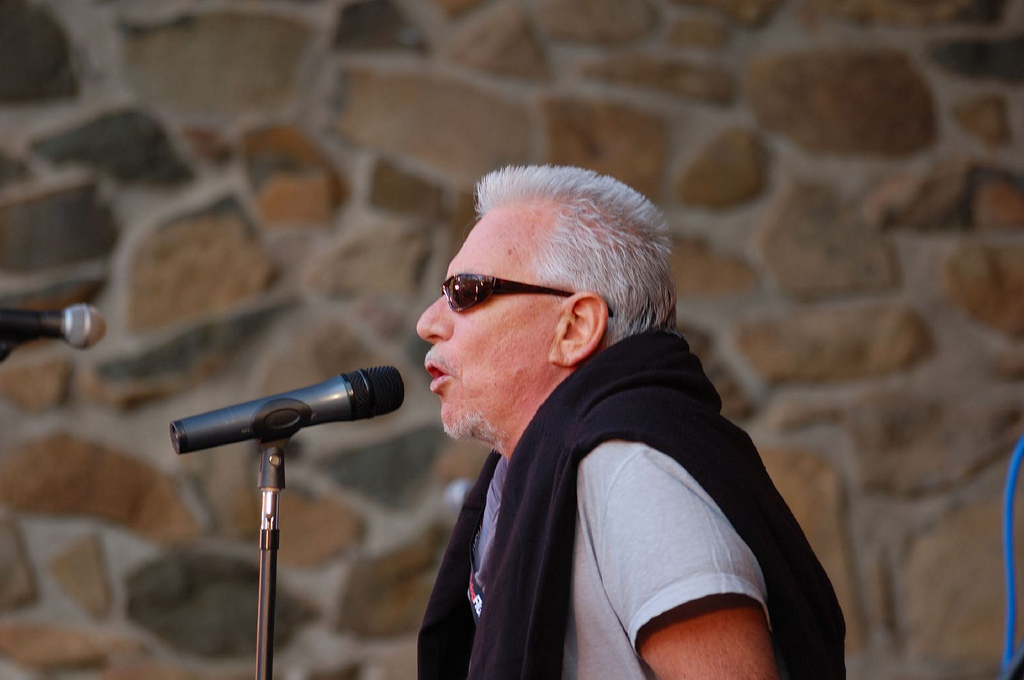
Eric Burdon at the Daffodil Festival at Hubbard Park, in Meriden, Connecticut, 2008

In 1991, Burdon and Brian Auger formed the "Eric Burdon – Brian Auger Band" with the following line-up: Eric Burdon – vocals, Brian Auger – keyboards, vocals, Dave Meros – bass guitar, vocals, Don Kirkpatrick – guitar, vocals and Paul Crowder – drums, vocals. By 1992, Larry Wilkins replaced Kirkpatrick and Karma Auger (Brian's son) replaced Crowder and in 1993 they added Richard Reguria (percussion). The live album Access All Areas was then released. In 1994 the "Eric Burdon – Brian Auger Band" disbanded. Burdon then formed the "Eric Burdon's i Band". The line-up included Larry Wilkins, Dean Restum (guitar), Dave Meros (bass) and Mark Craney (drums).

In 1995, Burdon made a guest appearance with Bon Jovi, singing "It's My Life"/"We Gotta Get out of This Place" medley at the Hall of Fame. He also released the album Lost Within the Halls of Fame, with past tracks and re-recordings of some songs from I Used to Be an Animal. In October 1996, Aynsley Dunbar replaced Craney on drums. The Official Live Bootleg was recorded in 1997 and in May that year Larry Wilkins died of cancer. He also released the compilation albums Soldier of Fortune and I'm Ready which featured recordings from the 1970s and 1980s.

In 1996, the lead singer of Brazilian rock band Camisa de Vênus, the vocalist Marcelo Nova worked in partnership with the former lead singer of the Animals. Burdon and Nova composed the song "Black & White World" and sang in a duet on "Don't Let Me Be Misunderstood" on the Camisa de Venus album Quem É Você?, produced by Burdon.

In 2000, he recorded the song "Power to the People" together with Ringo Starr and Billy Preston for the motion picture Steal This Movie!. On 11 May 2001, the Animals were inducted into the Rock Walk of Fame on Burdon's 60th birthday. On 3 March 2002, the live album Live in Seattle was recorded. Ex-War member Lee Oskar made a guest appearance on the album. In 2003 he made a guest appearance on the album Joyous in the City of Fools by the Greek rock band Pyx Lax, singing lead vocals on "Someone Wrote 'Save me' On a Wall".

In 2001, his second critically acclaimed memoir, Don't Let Me Be Misunderstood, written with author and filmmaker J. Marshall Craig, was released in the US, followed by editions in Greece, Germany and Australia; it covers the British Invasion, moving to Los Angeles and Palm Springs, and various anecdotes about Rock and Roll stardom.

On 7 June 2008, Burdon performed at the memorial service of Bo Diddley in Gainesville, Florida. During July and August 2008, Burdon appeared as the headline act of the "Hippiefest". He also recorded the single "For What It's Worth" with Carl Carlton and Max Buskohl.

On 22 January 2009 he first performed with his new band, including keyboardist Red Young, guitarist Rick Hirsch, bassist Jack Bryant and drummer Ed Friedland. For a few months he was sick and did not perform except in the United States. On 26 June, he began his European tour. The band included Red Young (keyboards), Billy Watts (guitar), Terry Wilson (bass), Brannen Temple (drums) and Georgia Dagaki (cretan lyra).

On 28 January 2013, Burdon performed on Late Night with Jimmy Fallon, backed by the Roots. Fallon hyped Burdon's current album, Til Your River Runs Dry. On 23 July 2013, he guested onstage with Bruce Springsteen and the E Street Band at Cardiff Millennium Stadium, performing "We Gotta Get Out of This Place". In August 2013, he toured with Pat Benatar and Neil Giraldo.

On 29 September 2021, Burdon performed on the Greek TV show Mousiko kouti hosted by Nikos Portokaloglou and Rena Morfi.

== Ownership of "The Animals" name ==
In 2008, an adjudicator determined that John Steel owned "The Animals" name in Britain by virtue of a trademark registration Steel had made in relation to the name. Eric Burdon had objected to the trademark registration, arguing that Burdon personally embodied any goodwill associated with the Animals name. Burdon's argument was rejected, in part based on the fact that he had billed himself as Eric Burdon and the Animals as early as 1967, thus separating the goodwill associated with his own name from that of the band.

In 2013, Burdon won an appeal, making him a joint owner of the Animals name.

== Film career ==
Burdon wanted to act in the film Blowup (1966). Director Michelangelo Antonioni wanted to use him as a musician in a club scene, but Burdon turned the role down because he had acted in films before in which he sang songs. He disbanded the Animals and went to California, where he met Jim Morrison of the Doors and decided he wanted to go into acting. Later, he turned down major roles in Zabriskie Point and Performance (both 1970).

In 1973, he formed the Eric Burdon Band and recorded the soundtrack for his own film project, Mirage. He spent much money to make this film, produced as a film for Atlantic. The film and the soundtrack were to be released in July 1974, but somehow they never were. The soundtrack was released in 2008.

In 1979, he acted in the TV film The 11th Victim, then in the German film Gibbi Westgermany (1980). In 1982, he starred in another German film, Comeback, again as a singer. In 1991, he made a cameo appearance in The Doors.

In 1998, he played himself in the Greek film My Brother and I, followed by a bigger role in the German film Snow on New Year's Eve (1999).

In the following years, he was credited in many documentaries and in an independent film called Fabulous Shiksa in Distress (2003), along with Ned Romero and Ted Markland. In 2007, he performed the traditional "Sometimes I Feel Like a Motherless Child" in the drama festival film The Blue Hour and in a documentary about Joshua Tree, called Nowhere Now (2008).

== Personal life ==
Due to his asthma and need for clean air, from the 1960s Burdon lived in California.

In 1967, Burdon married Angela "Angie" King, an Anglo-Indian hippie and model connected to the music scene. However, she left him the following year.

In 1972, Burdon married Rose Marks, with whom he has a daughter. They divorced in 1978.

In 1999, Burdon married Marianna Proestou, a Greek lawyer who is also his manager.

In 2021, during COVID-19, Burdon relocated to Athens, Greece.

== Discography ==
The Animals

- The Animals (1964; US)/The Animals (1964; UK)
- The Animals on Tour (1965; US)
- Animal Tracks (1965; UK)/Animal Tracks (1965; US)
- Animalisms (1966; UK)/Animalization (1966; US)
- Animalism (1966; US)
- Before We Were So Rudely Interrupted (1977; as the Original Animals)
- Ark (1983)
- Greatest Hits Live (Rip It to Shreds) (1984)

Eric Burdon & the Animals

- Eric Is Here (1967; US)
- Winds of Change (1967)
- The Twain Shall Meet (1968)
- Every One of Us (1968; US)
- Love Is (1968)

Eric Burdon and War

- Eric Burdon Declares "War" (1970)
- The Black-Man's Burdon (1970)
- Love Is All Around (1976)

Collaborations

- Guilty! (with Jimmy Witherspoon) (1971)

Solo

- Survivor (1977)
- Darkness Darkness (1980)
- Comeback (1982)
- I Used to Be an Animal (1988)
- Lost Within the Halls of Fame (1995)
- My Secret Life (2004)
- Soul of a Man (2006)
- Mirage (2008)
- Eric Burdon & The Greenhornes (2012)
- 'Til Your River Runs Dry (2013)

Eric Burdon Band

- Sun Secrets (1974)
- Stop (1975)
- Power Company (1983)
- That's Live (1985)

Eric Burdon's Fire Dept.

- Last Drive (1980)

== Books ==
- I Used to Be an Animal But I'm All Right Now, Faber and Faber, 1986, 978-0571134922

== Filmography ==
- 1964: Get Yourself a College Girl
- 1964: Whole Lotta Shakin'
- 1965: Pop Gear
- 1965: The Dangerous Christmas of Red Riding Hood
- 1967: World of the Animals
- 1967: The War (short)
- 1967: It's a Bikini World
- 1967: Tonite Let's All Make Love in London
- 1968: All My Loving
- 1968: Monterey Pop
- 1973: Mirage (never filmed)
- 1975: Hu-Man (French)
- 1979: 11th Victim
- 1980: Gibbi Westgermany
- 1982: Comeback
- 1991: The Doors
- 1998: My Brother And I (O adelfos mou ki ego)
- 1999: Snow on New Year's Eve
- 2001: Plaster Caster
- 2001: Screamin' Jay Hawkins: I Put a Spell on Me
- 2003: Fabulous Shiksa in Distress
- 2003: Yes, You Can Go Home
- 2007: The Blue Hour
- 2008: Nowhere Now: The Ballad of Joshua Tree
- 2010: Remembering Nigel
- 2010: Forever Young: How Rock 'n' Roll Grew Up (BBC Documentary)
- 2020: Eric Burdon: Rock ‘n’ Roll – Animal (BBC Documentary)
