= Homecoming Scotland 2009 =

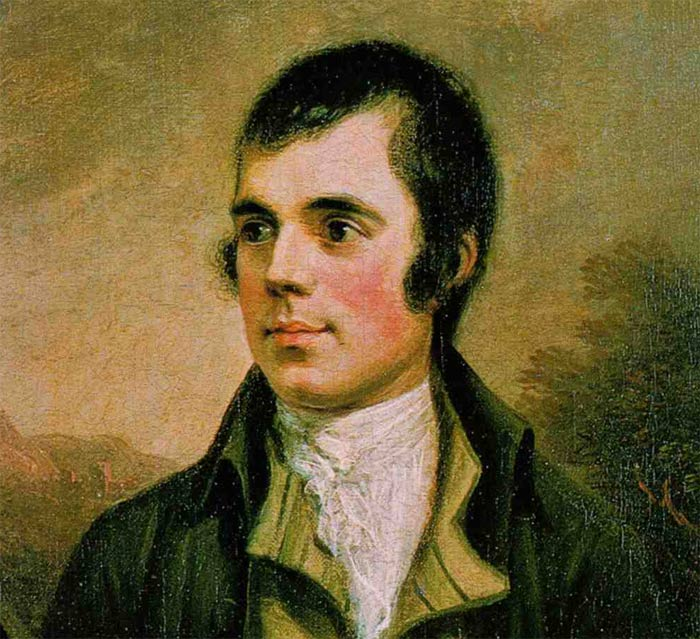
Homecoming celebrates the 250th anniversary of Robert Burns

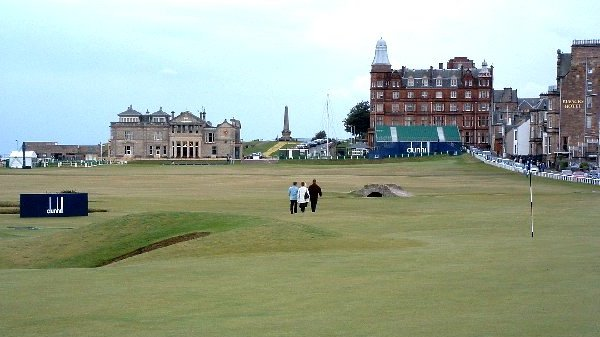
The Old Course at St Andrews - golf is one of five themes of Homecoming

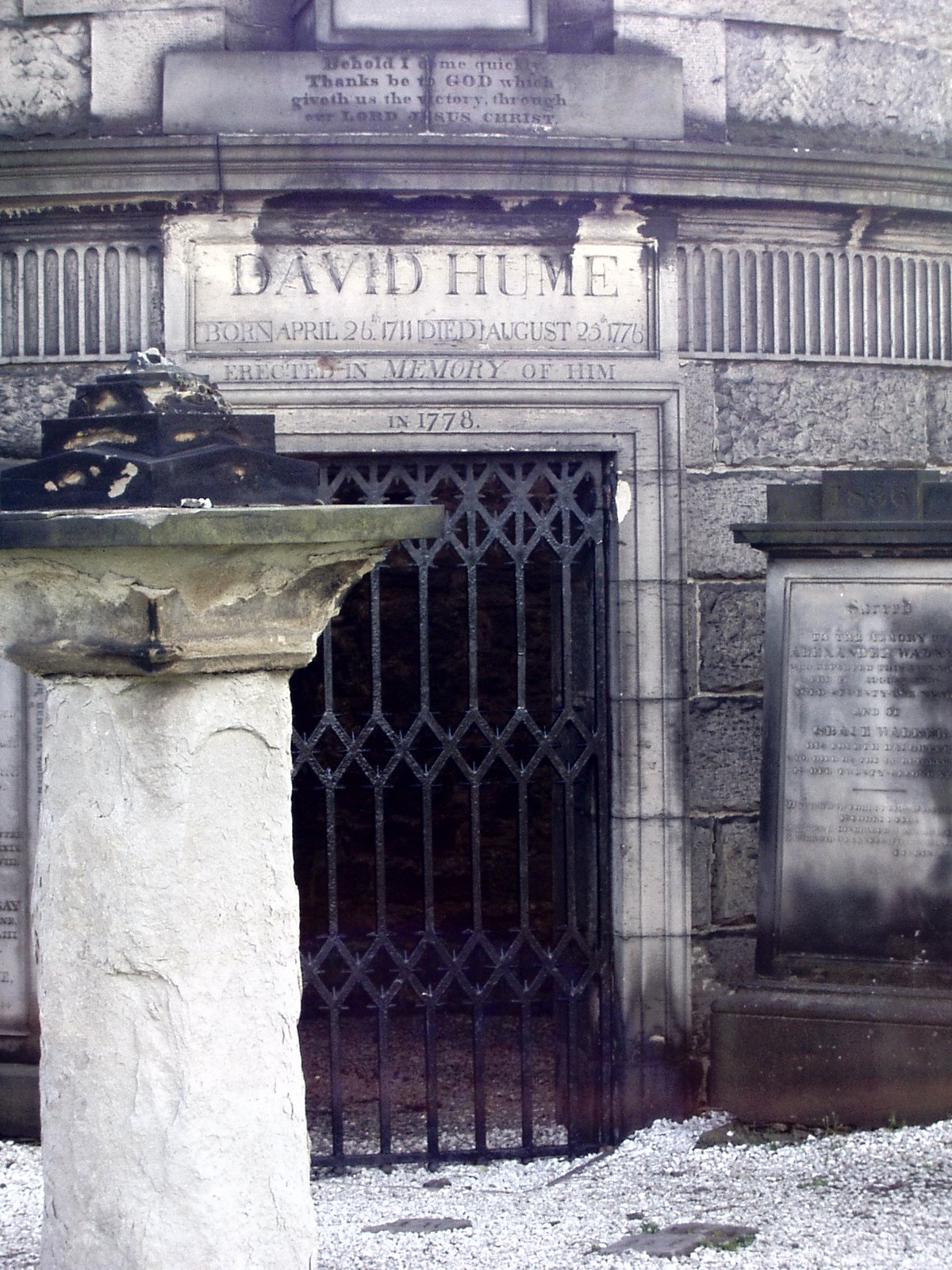
Tomb of David Hume, a major figure of the Scottish Enlightenment

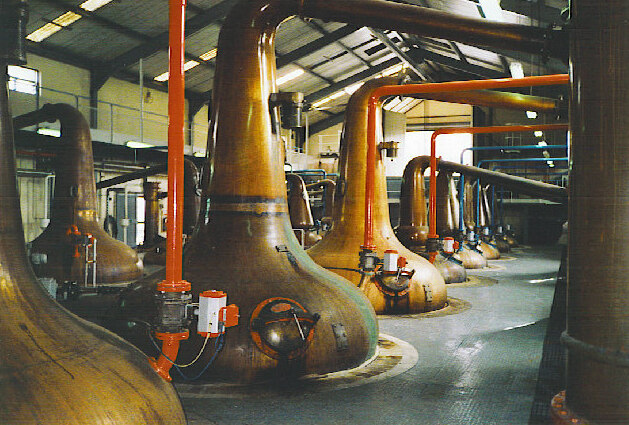
Stills at Glenfiddich - whisky is another theme

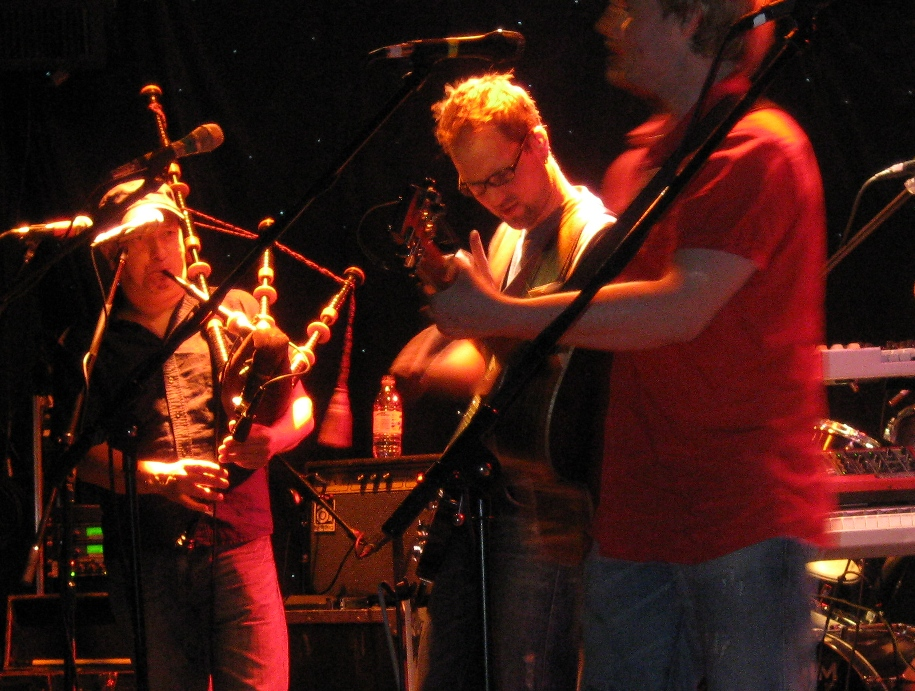
Enter the Haggis combine rock music and Highland bagpipes

Homecoming Scotland 2009 was a series of events designed to attract people of Scottish ancestry to visit Scotland. The campaign, organised by EventScotland and VisitScotland on behalf of the Scottish Government, and part-financed by the European Regional Development Fund, claimed that "for every single Scot in their native land, there are thought to be at least five more overseas who can claim Scottish ancestry."

2009 was the 250th anniversary of the birth of Robert Burns, the national poet. In addition to Burns-related events, the other four themes of the Homecoming were Scotland's culture and heritage, great Scottish minds and innovations, and golf and whisky.

== Calendar of events ==
On 16 June 2008 Scotland's First Minister, Alex Salmond MSP MP, officially launched Homecoming Scotland 2009 at Edinburgh Castle. The Homecoming started on 25 January 2009 (Burns night) and ran until 30 November 2009 (St Andrews Day).

On 24 July 2009 a Clan Convention, composed of the clan chiefs, clan commanders and leading clan representatives of Scottish clans, met to discuss the "Role of the Clan in the 21st century". The Clan Convention took place within the Scottish Parliament.

The centrepiece event of the year was The Gathering 2009, on 25 and 26 July, centred on Holyrood Park in Edinburgh. The clan gathering included highland games over the two days, a parade up the Royal Mile and a 'clan pageant' on the castle esplanade. Prince Charles, the Duke of Rothesay, is to be Patron of The Gathering 2009.

There was a long list of homecoming events, including several well-established events, e.g. (in date order):

- Celtic Connections
- Burns Night
- Aye Write!
- Glasgow International Comedy Festival
- Edinburgh International Science Festival
- Heineken Cup Final
- Edinburgh Sevens
- Return to the Ridings
- Royal Highland Show
- Edinburgh International Film Festival
- World Fly Fishing Championships
- Open Championship, Turnberry
- Inverness Highland Games
- Wickerman Festival
- Belladrum Tartan Heart Festival
- Johnnie Walker Championship, Gleneagles
- Edinburgh International Festival
- Edinburgh Military Tattoo
- World Pipe Band Championships
- Cowal Gathering
- Doors Open Days
- Wigtown Book Festival
- Loch Ness Marathon
- Royal National Mòd
- Scots Trad Music Awards

== Scottish Cup Sponsorship ==
In October 2008, it was announced that the Scottish Cup would be re-branded as The Homecoming Scottish Cup for the 2008/09 competition. Glasgow-based businessman Willie Haughey signed a two-year sponsorship deal for the cup, handing the branding rights over to the Scottish Government. A new name was applied to the 2009/10 competition.

== See also ==
- 2009 in Scotland
- Golf in Scotland
- Scottish clan
- Scottish people
- Tourism in Scotland
- The Gathering Ireland 2013
