= Weight over bar =

Sport

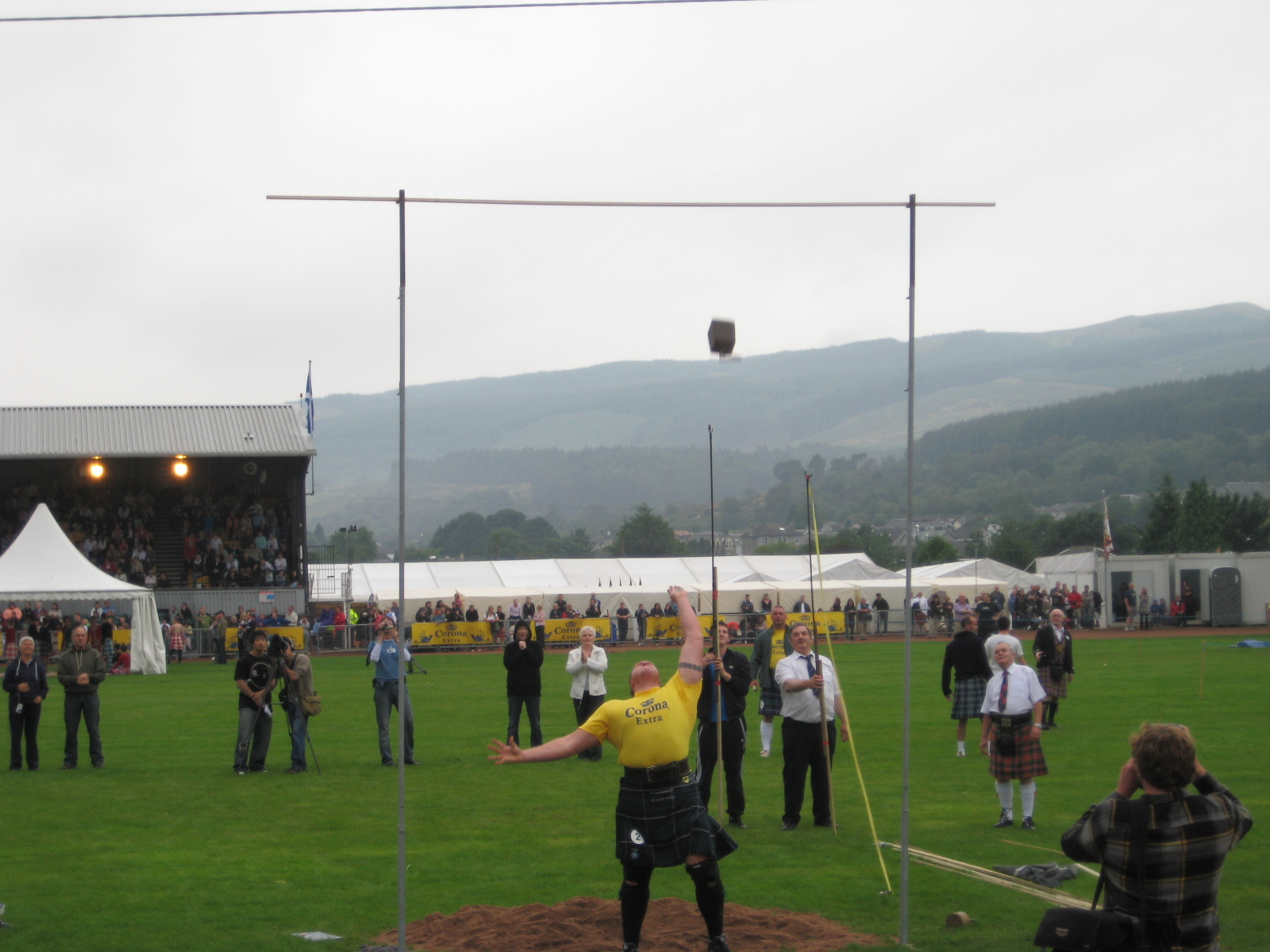
A man performing the Weight over bar (classic method) at Highland games.

Weight over bar (or Highland games 'one arm' weight over bar) (Scottish Gaelic: cuideam thairis air a 'bhàr, tilgeil cuideam air son àirde) is a traditional strength sport derived from ancient Scottish Highland games that involves the heaving of a 25.5 kg (56 lb) (half hundredweight) weight, over a bar using one hand.

Unlike its other counterpart, the Weight throw which involves a full body rotating spinning technique, the Weight over bar (classic method) requires the weight to be kept between the legs before swinging it up in a pendulum like manner, and releasing when it is at its apex, directly overhead.

In addition to classic method which is used frequently and accepted by all federations, there is also another traditional method called 'spin technique' which is described below under variations.

== History ==
The event dates back to about 600 years ago in ancient Scottish highland games where athletes threw a heavy block of iron using only one arm. The iron block was attached to a fixed small ring which itself was attached to a freely moving large ring used to grip the weight. The weight measurement derived from the imperial unit Stone, where a weight of 4 stones (1 stone = 14 lb) was used as a counterbalance for weight measurements when buying or selling in the ancient Scottish markets.

In 1980 World's Strongest Man, the event was introduced to Strongman for the first time where the competitors had to throw the same 25.5 kg (56 lb) weight using only 1 arm for max height. With each successful attempt, the bar was raised higher, eliminating the competitors one by one. Each competitor usually gets three attempts to clear each height.

== World record ==
- 25.5 kg (56 lb) over 6.20 metres (20 ft 4 in) by Hafþór Júlíus Björnsson (Iceland) (2026 Sherwook Park Highland Games)

→ Having broken the world record a total of thirteen times, Hafþór is widely regarded as the undisputed greatest of all time at this event. He is also the only man who has ever cleared 5.95 metres (19 ft 6 in) or more, which he has done ten times.
Second best athlete in history is Highland games specialist Spencer Tyler (United States) who has cleared 5.92 metres (19 ft 5 in), and third best athlete in history is former world record holder and Highland games specialist Mike Zolkiewicz (United States) who has cleared 5.82 metres (19 ft 1 in). Even though it happened during 56 lb versus 55 lb weight discrepancy of 2012–2013, pro strongman athletes Mikhail Koklyaev (Russia) and Mike Burke (United States) both have also cleared 5.82 metres (19 ft 1 in) but with the 25 kg (55 lb) weight making them the joint-fourth best athletes in history.

=== Progression of the world record ===
Height	Holder	Year and Event	Location
4.17 metres (13 ft 8 in)	(Scotland) George Clark	1951	(To be confirmed)
4.26 metres (14 ft 0 in)	(Scotland) Henry Alexander Gray	1958	(To be confirmed)
4.32 metres (14 ft 2 in)	(England) Arthur Rowe	1963	(To be confirmed)
4.43 metres (14 ft 6 in)	(England) Arthur Rowe	1965	(To be confirmed)
4.50 metres (14 ft 9 in)	(United States) Paul Bidwell	1969	(To be confirmed)
4.56 metres (15 ft 0 in)	(Scotland) Bill Anderson	1970	(To be confirmed)
4.64 metres (15 ft 3 in)	(United States) Paul Bidwell	1971	(To be confirmed)
4.75 metres (15 ft 7 in)	(Scotland) Bill Anderson	1973 Braemar Gathering Games	Braemar, Scotland
4.88 metres (16 ft 0 in)	(Scotland) Bill Anderson	1977	Aberfeldy, Scotland
4.90 metres (16 ft 1 in)	(Scotland) Bill Anderson	1977	Scotland
4.92 metres (16 ft 2 in)	(United States) Guy Dirkin	1978 Corby Highland Games	Corby, England
5.00 metres (16 ft 5 in)	(Scotland) Grant Anderson	1978	Scotland
5.06 metres (16 ft 7 in)	(United States) Brian Oldfield	1979	Stow, Ohio, USA
5.06 metres (16 ft 7 in)	(England) Jim Whitehead	1980 Corby Highland Games	Corby, England
5.18 metres (17 ft 0 in)	(Canada) Bishop Dolegiewicz	1980 World's Strongest Man	Vernon, New Jersey, USA
5.20 metres (17 ft 1 in)	(England) Geoff Capes	1981 World's Strongest Man	Magic Mountain, California, USA
5.23 metres (17 ft 2 in)	(England) Geoff Capes	1981 World Highland Games	Lagos, Nigeria
5.23 metres (17 ft 2 in)	(United States) Jim McGoldrick	1985	Fergus Falls, Minnesota, USA
5.26 metres (17 ft 3 in)	(United States) Bill Kazmaier	1987 Pure Strength	Huntly Castle, Aberdeenshire, Scotland
5.26 metres (17 ft 3 in)	(Iceland) Jón Páll Sigmarsson	1987 Pure Strength	Huntly Castle, Aberdeenshire, Scotland
5.34 metres (17 ft 6 in)	(United States) Bill Kazmaier	1987 Pure Strength	Huntly Castle, Aberdeenshire, Scotland
5.37 metres (17 ft 7 in)	(United States) Paul Ferency	1990 Celtic Classic Highland Games	Bethlehem, Pennsylvania, USA
5.50 metres (18 ft 1 in)	(Hungary) László Fekete	1992 Europe's Strongest Man	Budapest, Hungary
5.54 metres (18 ft 2 in)	(United States) Ben Plucknett	1993	(To be confirmed)
5.57 metres (18 ft 3 in)	(Austria) Manfred Hoeberl	1993 European Hercules	Oulu, Finland
5.60 metres (18 ft 4 in)	(Austria) Manfred Hoeberl	1994 World Strongman Challenge	New Zealand
5.60 metres (18 ft 4 in)	(Netherlands) Wout Zijlstra	1998 World's Strongest Team	Hardenberg, Netherlands
5.62 metres (18 ft 5 in)	(Iceland) Sæmundur Sæmundsson	1999 Icelandic Highland Games	Akranes, Iceland
5.65 metres (18 ft 6 in)	(Netherlands) Wout Zijlstra	2000 World Grand Prix world series	(To be confirmed)
5.70 metres (18 ft 8 in)	(Netherlands) Wout Zijlstra	2002 Den Helder Highland Games	Den Helder, Netherlands
5.72 metres (18 ft 9 in)	(United States) Mike Zolkiewicz	2009 World Highland Games	Antigonish, Nova Scotia, Canada
5.75 metres (18 ft 10 in)	(United States) Mike Zolkiewicz	2012 Rhode Island Highland Games	Richmond, Rhode Island, USA
5.77 metres (18 ft 11 in)	(United States) Mike Zolkiewicz	2012	Chicago, USA
5.79 metres (19 ft 0 in)	(United States) Mike Zolkiewicz	2012 Fairhill Scottish Games	Maryland, USA
5.82 metres (19 ft 1 in)	(United States) Mike Zolkiewicz	2013 Rhode Island Highland Games	Richmond, Rhode Island, USA
5.85 metres (19 ft 2 in)	(Iceland) Hafþór Júlíus Björnsson	2014 New Hampshire Highland Games	Livermore, New Hampshire, USA
5.87 metres (19 ft 3 in)	(Iceland) Hafþór Júlíus Björnsson	2015 Arnold Strongman Classic	Columbus, Ohio, USA
5.90 metres (19 ft 4 in)	(Iceland) Hafþór Júlíus Björnsson	2015 New Hampshire Highland Games	Livermore, New Hampshire, USA
5.92 metres (19 ft 5 in)	(Iceland) Hafþór Júlíus Björnsson	2016 Arnold Strongman Classic	Columbus, Ohio, USA
5.95 metres (19 ft 6 in)	(Iceland) Hafþór Júlíus Björnsson	2016 Caledonian Club Highland Games	Pleasanton, California, USA
5.98 metres (19 ft 7 in)	(Iceland) Hafþór Júlíus Björnsson	2017 Arnold Strongman Classic	Columbus, Ohio, USA
6.00 metres (19 ft 8 in)	(Iceland) Hafþór Júlíus Björnsson	2017 Icelandic Highland Games	Akranes, Iceland
6.03 metres (19 ft 9 in)	(Iceland) Hafþór Júlíus Björnsson	2017 New Hampshire Highland Games	Livermore, New Hampshire, USA
6.10 metres (20 ft 0 in)	(Iceland) Hafþór Júlíus Björnsson	2018 Arnold Strongman Classic	Columbus, Ohio, USA
6.13 metres (20 ft 1 in)	(Iceland) Hafþór Júlíus Björnsson	2018 Caledonian Club Highland Games	Pleasanton, California, USA
6.15 metres (20 ft 2 in)	(Iceland) Hafþór Júlíus Björnsson	2019 Arnold Strongman Classic	Columbus, Ohio, USA
6.17 metres (20 ft 3 in)	(Iceland) Hafþór Júlíus Björnsson	2022 Rogue Invitational	Austin, Texas, USA
6.20 metres (20 ft 4 in)	(Iceland) Hafþór Júlíus Björnsson	2026 Sherwood Park Highland Games	Edmonton, Canada

56 lb versus 55 lb weight discrepancy during 2012–2013: Due to several strongman organizations using the metric system, some world record throws during these two years are now classified as unofficial world records. In 2012, Mikhail Koklyaev threw a 25 kg (55 lb) weight over 5.82 metres (19 ft 1 in) surpassing Mike Zolkiewicz's 5.79 metres (19 ft 0 in), however since the weight was 1 pound less than the traditional 56 pounds it is not recognized as an official world record. In 2013, Mike Burke threw the same 25 kg (55 lb) weight over 5.82 metres (19 ft 1 in) which would equal Zolkiewicz's world record and on the same competition Hafþór Júlíus Björnsson threw it over 6.00 metres (19 ft 8 in) which would have been 7 inches above Zolkiewicz's world record but just like with Koklyaev in 2012, they are also not recognized as official world records.

== Variations ==
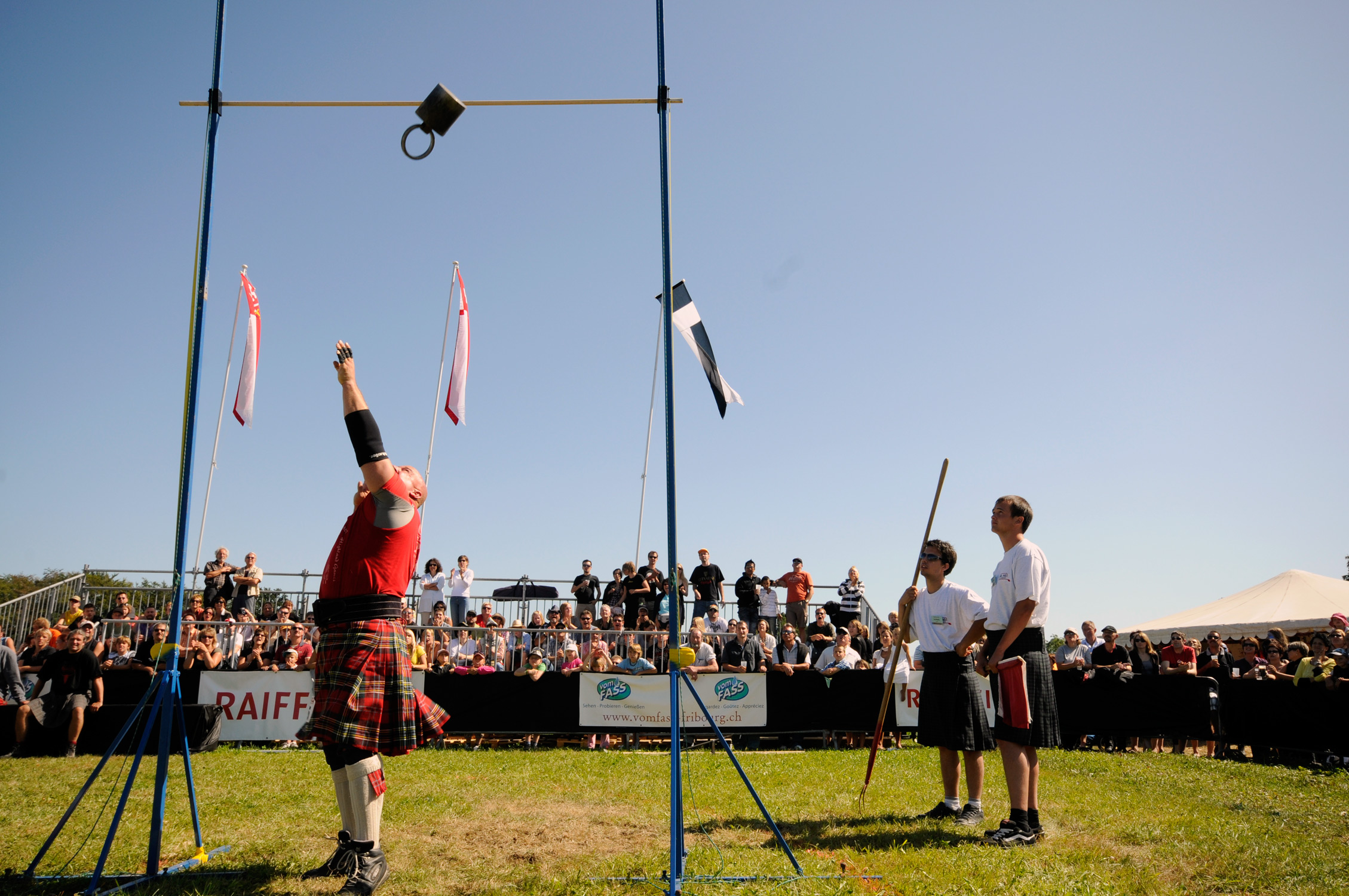
A man performing the Weight over bar (using spin technique).

Another traditional variation (which might not be recognized by some Highland games federations) is the 'spin technique' where athletes incorporate a spinning motion and finally releasing the implement from the side. With this extra momentum, athletes can throw the weight higher than the classic method.

With the advent of strongman, weight over bar underwent several variations, for example in 1992 World's Strongest Man, the competitors had to throw a 30 kg (66 lb) Thor's hammer using both hands, and in 1993 World's Strongest Man, the competitors had to throw a 20 kg (44 lb) concrete block using both hands over a contraption which was called the Trojan wall.

At the 2017 Arnold Strongman Classic, the competitors had to throw very heavy sandbags using both hands over a 15 ft bar for maximum weight. In 2024, the organizers of the 2024 Arnold UK Strongman competition paid a tribute to David P. Webster by modifying the event where the competitors had to throw a sandbag instead. Just like in the block of iron with the ring, when it comes to the sandbags they made a handle where competitors could grip it similarly.

In all the variations, the weights were thrown overhead, to the rear of the thrower, and over the top of the bar to prove clearance.

=== Sandbag over bar ===
The five heaviest sandbags ever tossed over a standard 15 ft bar

Weight	Holder	Year and Event	Location
45.4 kg (100 lb) WR	(Iceland) Hafþór Júlíus Björnsson	2017 Arnold Strongman Classic	Columbus, Ohio, USA
43.1 kg (95 lb)	(Iceland) Hafþór Júlíus Björnsson	2018 Arnold Strongman Classic	Columbus, Ohio, USA
40.8 kg (90 lb)	(Iceland) Hafþór Júlíus Björnsson	2017 Arnold Strongman Classic	Columbus, Ohio, USA
40.8 kg (90 lb)	(Iceland) Hafþór Júlíus Björnsson	2020 Arnold Strongman Classic	Columbus, Ohio, USA
40.8 kg (90 lb)	(United States) Brian Shaw	2018 Arnold Strongman Classic	Columbus, Ohio, USA

Furthermore, below athletes have also tossed a 70 lb or heavier sandbag over a standard 15 ft bar:
38.6 kg (85 lb) by Mikhail Shivlyakov
34.0 kg (75 lb) by JF Caron, Mateusz Kieliszkowski and Nick Guardione
31.8 kg (70 lb) by Matjaz Belsak, Martins Licis, Paddy Haynes, Hilmar Örn Jónsson, Lucas Hatton, Austin Hamm and Zachary Price

The five heaviest sandbags ever tossed over a standard 15 ft bar by female athletes

Weight	Holder	Year and Event	Location
21.6 kg (47.5 lb) WR	(Ukraine) Olga Liashchuk	2025 America's Strongest Woman	Las Vegas, Nevada, USA
20.4 kg (45 lb)	(Ukraine) Olga Liashchuk	2022 Clash 91's Games	Baltimore, Maryland, USA
20.4 kg (45 lb)	(United States) Taylor Doxey	2025 America's Strongest Woman	Las Vegas, Nevada, USA
19.3 kg (42.5 lb)	(United States) Amber DeLuca	2023 No Fame Scottish Highland Games	Albuquerque, New Mexico, USA
19.3 kg (42.5 lb)	(United States) Jackie Rhodes	2025 America's Strongest Woman	Las Vegas, Nevada, USA

Furthermore, below athletes have also tossed a 35 lb or heavier sandbag over a standard 15 ft bar:
18.1 kg (40 lb) by Hannah Linzay, Nadia Stowers and Sumer Johnson
15.9 kg (35 lb) by Britta Maggard and Rebecca Houston

== See also ==
- Keg-tossing
