= Weight throw =

Sports

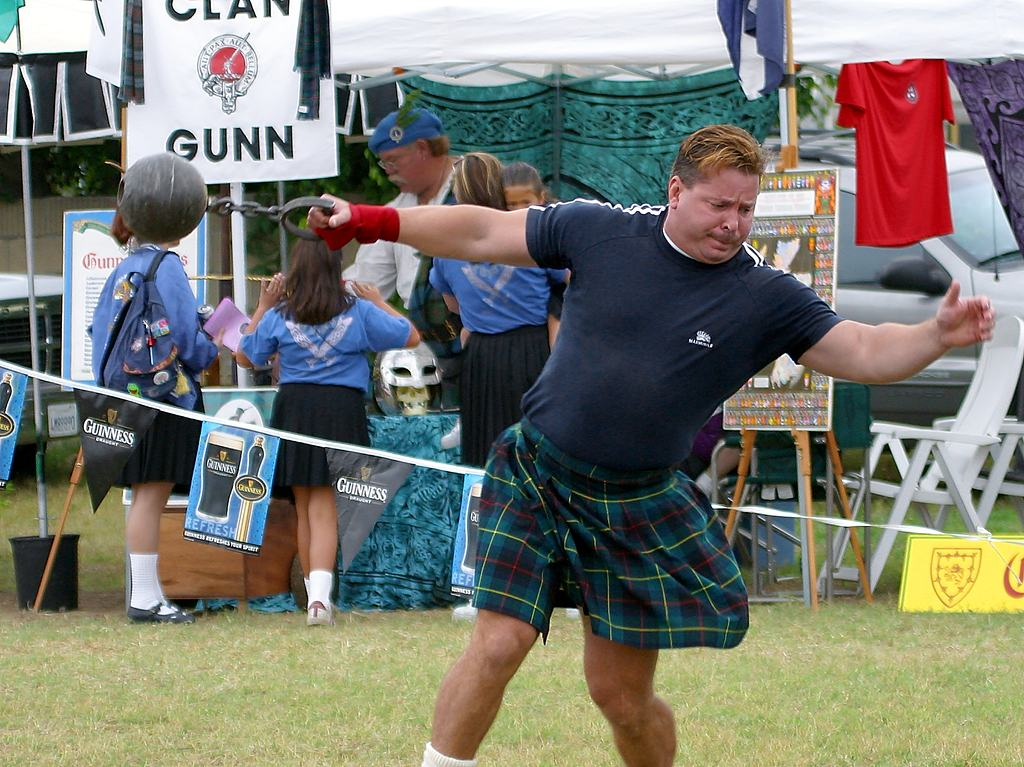
Weight throw (Highland games version) at 2002 Celtic Festival

Weight throw (or Weight for distance) is a traditional strength sport and throwing event derived from ancient Scottish Highland games. Unlike its other counterpart, the Weight over bar which involves a stationary pendulum like swing for height, the Weight throw involves a full body rotation and throwing of a metal ball attached to a handle via a chain, for the furthest distance. It has been used both in Highland games (Scottish Gaelic: caitheamh cuideam) as well as in track and field.

Highland games version permits the use of only one hand, and the athletes are required to rotate and throw under two disciplines: either 12.5 kg (28 lb) (light version/ light weight) or 25.5 kg (56 lb) (heavy version/ heavy weight), both for distance. For women, the weights differ, with 6.5 kg (14 lb) for light weight and 12.5 kg (28 lb) for heavy weight, while for masters and junior men categories, the weight commonly used is 19 kg (42 lb).

In the track and field version (which is most popular in the United States as an indoor equivalent to the hammer throw), the athletes are permitted to use both hands and the athletes are required to rotate and throw 16 kg (35 lb) for men and 9 kg (20 lb) for women for distance. However, it is not recognized by World Athletics, despite being included twice in 1904 and 1920 Olympic games.

== Highland games version ==
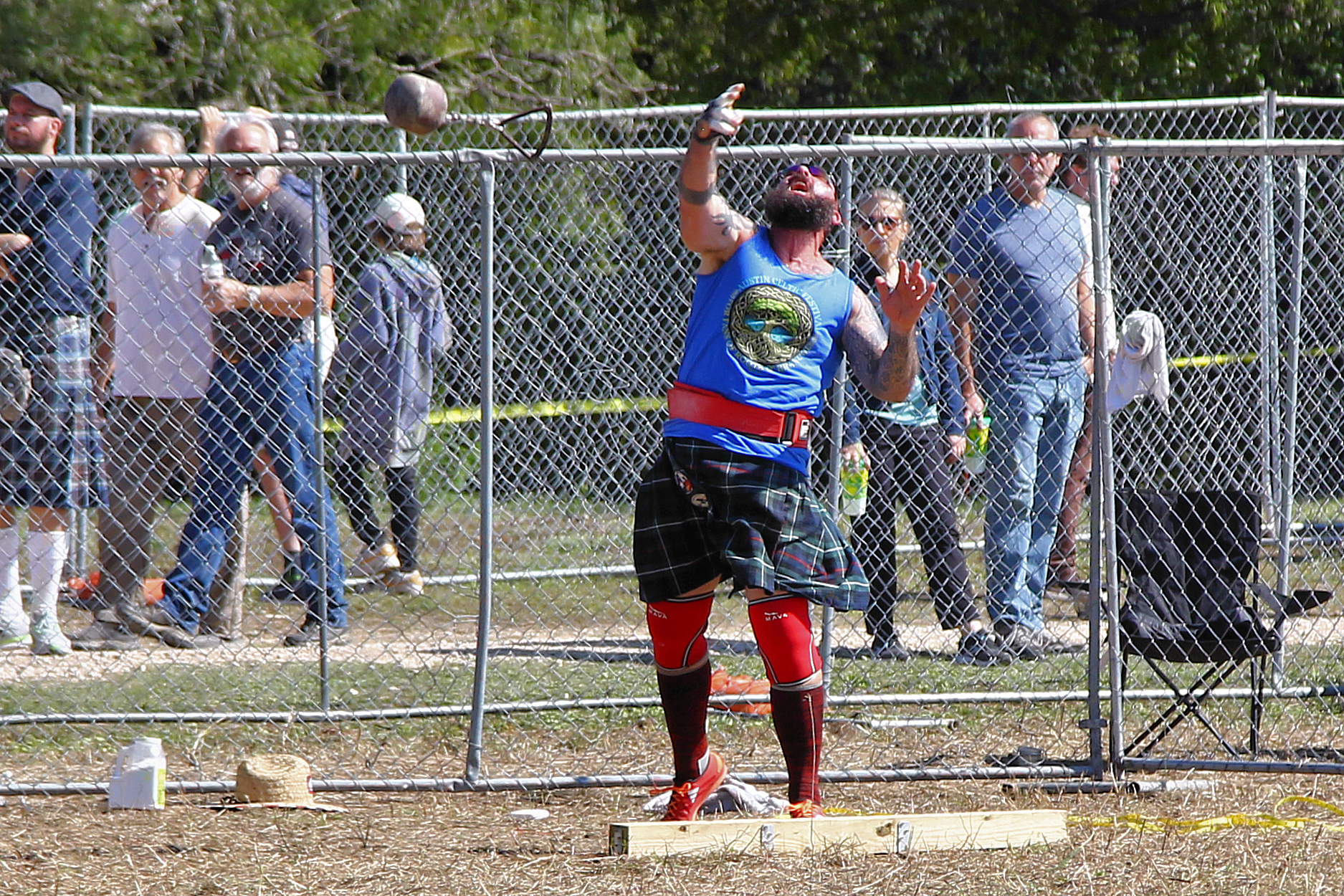
An athlete releasing the weight during the Weight throw event at Austin Celtic festival Highland games.

In the Highland Games, the weight throw consists of two separate events, the light weight and the heavy weight. In both cases, the implement consists of a steel or lead weight (usually spherical or cylindrical) attached by a short chain to a metal handle. The handle may be a d-ring, a triangle or a ring. The size of the weight depends on the class of the competition.

For open class male athletes, the light weight is 28 lb, or two stone (12.7 kg). The heavy weight is 56 lb, or four stone (25.4 kg). For male master class or senior athletes, the weights are 28 and 42 lb (13 and 19 kg). For all female athletes, the weights are 14 and 28 lb (6.4 and 12.7 kg) for the light and heavy versions, respectively. Athletics Ireland also recognizes 35 lb (15.9 kg) as the weight for men below 18 years.

The weight is thrown from a rectangular (4.5 feet by 9 feet) area behind a toe board or trig. The athlete must stay behind the trig at all times during the throw. The techniques vary, but usually involve a turning or spinning motion to increase momentum before the release. Each athlete gets three attempts, with places determined by the best throw.

=== World records ===
- Light weight 12.5 kg (28 lb) for 29.76 metres (97 ft 8 in) by Spencer Tyler (United States) (2019 US Invitational Pleasanton)
- Heavy weight 25.5 kg (56 lb) for 15.62 metres (51 ft 3 in) by Spencer Tyler (United States) (2019 New Hampshire Highland Games)

→ Having broken the two records a combined seven times (four times with the light weight and three times with the heavy weight), Tyler is widely regarded as the undisputed greatest of all time at this event. Some other all-time greats of the two disciplines who have held both records are Francis Brebner, Hamish Davidson and Bill Anderson.

=== Progression of the world records ===
==== Light weight 12.5 kg (28 lb) ====
Distance	Holder	Year	Location
26.56 metres (87 ft 2 in)	(Scotland) Bill Anderson	1966	Crieff, Scotland
27.08 metres (88 ft 10 in)	(Scotland) Hamish Davidson	1978	(To be confirmed)
27.74 metres (91 ft 0 in)	(England) Geoff Capes	1983	Drumtochty, Scotland
28.65 metres (94 ft 0 in)	(England) Geoff Capes	1987	Kilbirnie, Scotland
28.67 metres (94 ft 1 in)	(Scotland) Francis Brebner	1996	Anne Arundel, Maryland, USA
28.81 metres (94 ft 6 in)	(Australia) Matt Sandford	1999	Estes Park, Colorado, USA
29.21 metres (95 ft 10 in)	(Scotland) Gregor Edmunds	2011	Markinch, Scotland
29.29 metres (96 ft 1 in)	(United States) Spencer Tyler	2018	Topeka, Kansas, USA
29.42 metres (96 ft 6 in)	(United States) Spencer Tyler	2018	(To be confirmed)
29.58 metres (97 ft 1 in)	(United States) Spencer Tyler	2019	Long Beach, California, USA
29.76 metres (97 ft 8 in)	(United States) Spencer Tyler	2019	Pleasanton, California, USA

==== Heavy weight 25.5 kg (56 lb) ====
Distance	Holder	Year	Location
12.77 metres (41 ft 11 in)	(Scotland) Bill Anderson	1969	Aboyne, Scotland
13.28 metres (43 ft 7 in)	(Scotland) Hamish Davidson	1981	(To be confirmed)
13.30 metres (43 ft 8 in)	(Scotland) Francis Brebner	1990	Tomintoul, Scotland
13.34 metres (43 ft 9 in)	(Scotland) Francis Brebner	1991	Dufftown, Scotland
13.95 metres (45 ft 9 in)	(Scotland) Francis Brebner	1992	Tomintoul, Scotland
14.28 metres (46 ft 10 in)	(Scotland) Francis Brebner	1993	Tomintoul, Scotland
14.45 metres (47 ft 5 in)	(Scotland) Francis Brebner	1996	Tomintoul, Scotland
14.58 metres (47 ft 10 in)	(Scotland) Francis Brebner	1998	Tomintoul, Scotland
14.63 metres (48 ft 0 in)	(United States) Karl Dodge	1998	Kiowa, Colorado, USA
14.65 metres (48 ft 1 in)	(Scotland) Francis Brebner	1999	Tomintoul, Scotland
14.88 metres (48 ft 10 in)	(United States) Ryan Vierra	2002	Stone Mountain, Georgia, USA
14.99 metres (49 ft 2 in)	(United States) Ryan Vierra	2005	Las Vegas, Nevada, USA
15.14 metres (49 ft 8 in)	(United States) Eric Frasure	2005	Huntersville, North Carolina, USA
15.19 metres (49 ft 10 in)	(United States) Eric Frasure	2008	Portland, Oregon, USA
15.27 metres (50 ft 1 in)	(United States) Spencer Tyler	2016	Portland, Oregon, USA
15.58 metres (51 ft 1 in)	(United States) Spencer Tyler	2018	Columbus, Ohio, USA
15.62 metres (51 ft 3 in)	(United States) Spencer Tyler	2019	Lincoln, New Hampshire, USA

== Track and field version ==
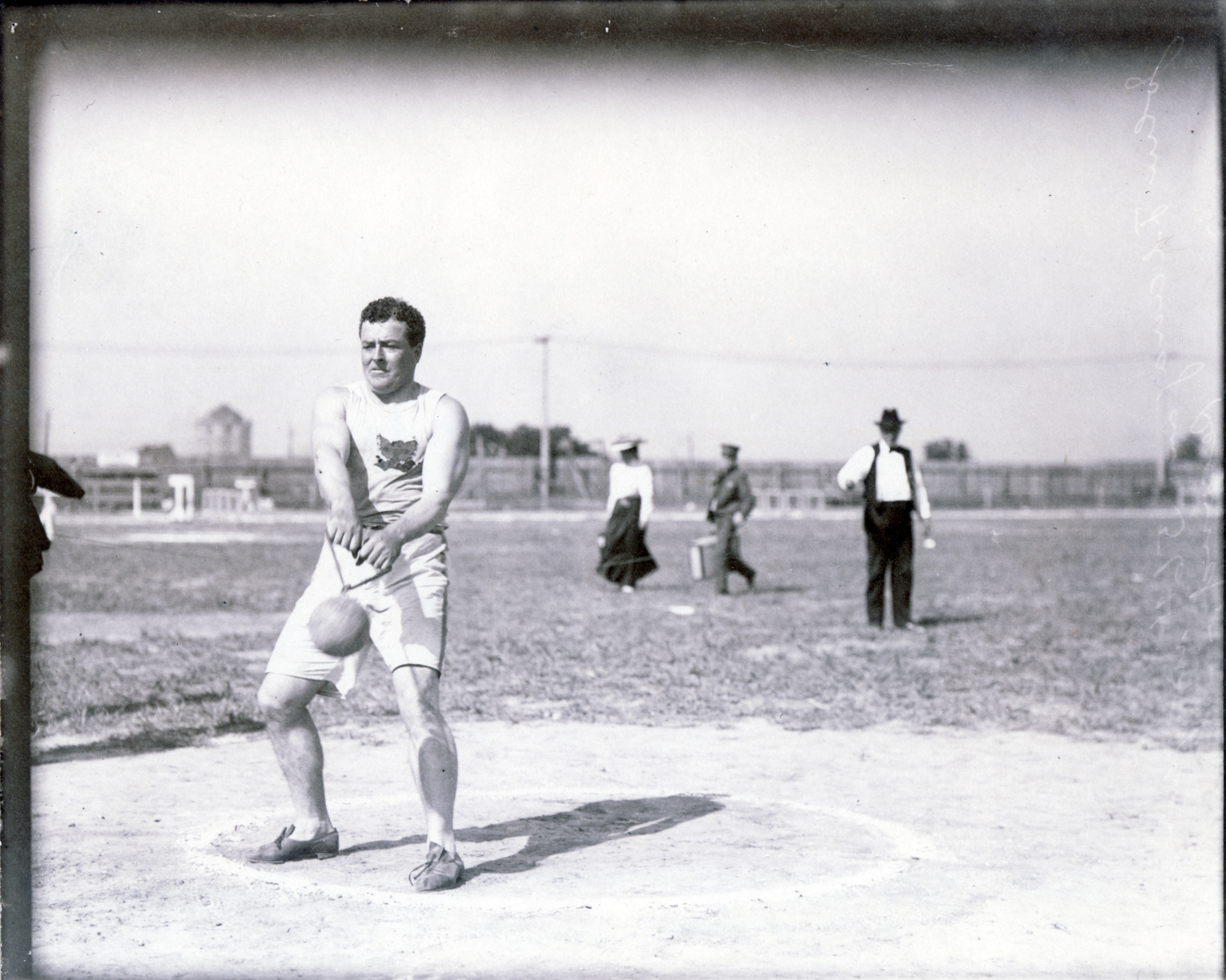
John Flannigan throwing the 56-pound weight at the 1904 Olympics.

The weight throw has been featured twice under the name of '56 pound weight throw' at the Olympic Games.

First was in 1904 Summer Olympics held in St. Louis, and then in 1920 Summer Olympics held in Antwerp. Étienne Desmarteau and Pat McDonald emerged champions respectively.

=== Furthest throws in history ===
Key:

- O = Outdoor performance
- A = affected by altitude

==== Men ====
Rank	Result	Athlete	Nationality	Date	Place	Ref.
1	26.35 m (86 ft 5 1/4 in) A	Daniel Haugh	United States	16 February 2024	Albuquerque	
2	25.86 m (84 ft 10 in)	Lance Deal	United States	4 March 1995	Atlanta	
3	25.68 m (84 ft 3 in)	Libor Charfreitag	Slovakia	5 March 2005	Sterling	
4	25.66 m (84 ft 2 in)	Ryan Johnson	United States	27 February 2026	Indianapolis	
5	25.59 m (83 ft 11 1/4 in)	Daniel Reynolds	United States	6 December 2025	Laramie	
6	25.58 m (83 ft 11 in)	Michael Lihrman	United States	28 February 2015	Geneva	
7	25.31 m (83 ft 1/4 in) A	Conor McCullough	United States	14 February 2020	Albuquerque	
8	25.18 m (82 ft 7 1/4 in)	A. G. Kruger	United States	20 January 2012	Findlay	
9	25.17 m (82 ft 6 3/4 in) O	Jüri Tamm	Estonia	11 July 1992	Mäntyharju	
10	25.12 m (82 ft 4 3/4 in)	Kibwé Johnson	United States	24 February 2008	Boston	
11	24.72 m (81 ft 1 in)	Scott Russell	Canada	8 February 2002	Ames	
12	24.60 m (80 ft 8 1/2 in) A	Daniel Roberts	United States	14 February 2020	Albuquerque	
13	24.49 m (80 ft 4 in)	Trey Knight	United States	14 March 2025	Virginia Beach	
14	24.48 m (80 ft 3 3/4 in)	Jake Freeman	United States	12 February 2009	Riverdale	
15	24.46 m (80 ft 2 3/4 in)	Thomas Mardal	Norway	11 March 2021	Fayetteville	
16	24.45 m (80 ft 2 1/2 in) A	Israel Oloyede	United States	22 January 2022	Albuquerque	
17	24.43 m (80 ft 1 3/4 in)	Andras Haklits	Croatia	9 March 2001	Fayetteville	
18	24.42 m (80 ft 1 1/4 in) A	Alex Young	United States	14 February 2020	Albuquerque	
19	24.41 m (80 ft 1 in) A	Isaiah Rogers	United States	16 February 2024	Albuquerque	
20	24.40 m (80 ft 1/2 in)	Garland Porter	United States	4 February 2011	Findlay	
21	24.39 m (80 ft 0 in)	Chukwuebuka Enekwechi	Nigeria	13 February 2015	West Lafayette	
21	24.39 m (80 ft 0 in)	Jud Logan	United States	28 February 1992	Princeton	
21	24.39 m (80 ft 0 in)	Kenneth Ikeji	Great Britain	24 February 2024	Cambridge	
24	24.38 m (79 ft 11 3/4 in) A O	Cory Martin	United States	27 February 2010	Albuquerque	
24	24.38 m (79 ft 11 3/4 in)	Gleb Dudarev	Belarus	23 January 2020	Lawrence	

===== Notes =====
Below is a list of additional performances (excluding ancillary throws) equal or superior to 24.48 m:

- Ryan Johnson also threw 25.64 m (84 ft 1 1/4 in) (2026), 24.58 m (80 ft 7 1/2 in) (2026) and 24.48 m (80 ft 3 3/4 in) (2025).
- Lance Deal also threw 25.48 m (83 ft 7 in) (1996), 25.41 m (83 ft 4 1/4 in) (1991), 24.90 m (81 ft 8 1/4 in) (1995), 24.84 m (81 ft 5 3/4 in) (1993) and 24.82 m (81 ft 5 in) (1993).
- Daniel Haugh also threw 25.44 m (83 ft 5 1/2 in) A (2023), 25.04 m (82 ft 1 3/4 in) A (2020), 24.93 m (81 ft 9 1/4 in) (2022), 24.70 m (81 ft 1/4 in) (2020).
- Libor Charfreitag also threw 25.28 m (82 ft 11 1/4 in) (2005), 25.26 m (82 ft 10 1/4 in) (2008), 25.03 m (82 ft 1 1/4 in) (2003), 24.88 m (81 ft 7 1/2 in) (2011), 24.86 m (81 ft 6 1/2 in) (2003) and 24.68 m (80 ft 11 1/2 in) (2005).
- Kibwé Johnson also threw 25.08 m (82 ft 3 1/4 in) (2007).
- Daniel Reynolds also threw 25.08 m (82 ft 3 1/4 in) (2025), 25.06 m (82 ft 2 1/2 in) (2025), 24.72 m (81 ft 1 in) (2025) and 24.62 m (80 ft 9 1/4 in) (2026).
- Alfred Kruger also threw 24.99 m (81 ft 11 3/4 in) (2010), 24.78 m (81 ft 3 1/2 in) (2007) and 24.68 m (80 ft 11 1/2 in) (2012).
- Mike Lihrman also threw 24.91 m (81 ft 8 1/2 in) (2015).
- Conor McCullough also threw 24.48 m (80 ft 3 3/4 in) (2018).

==== Women ====
Rank	Result	Athlete	Nationality	Date	Place	Ref.
1	26.02 m (85 ft 4 1/4 in) A	DeAnna Price	United States	17 February 2023	Albuquerque	
2	25.73 m (84 ft 4 3/4 in) A	Erin Reese	United States	17 February 2024	Albuquerque	
3	25.60 m (83 ft 11 3/4 in) A	Gwen Berry	United States	4 March 2017	Albuquerque	
3	25.60 m (83 ft 11 3/4 in)	Janeah Stewart	United States	21 January 2023	Nashville	
5	25.56 m (83 ft 10 1/4 in)	Brittany Riley	United States	10 March 2007	Fayetteville	
6	25.55 m (83 ft 9 3/4 in)	Shey Taiwo	United States	11 March 2022	Birmingham	
7	25.47 m (83 ft 6 3/4 in)	Jalani Davis	United States	13 February 2026	Fayetteville	
8	25.32 m (83 ft 3/4 in)	Oyesade Olatoye	Nigeria	10 February 2023	Nashville	
9	25.19 m (82 ft 7 1/2 in)	Rachel Tanczos	United States	3 February 2024	Notre Dame	
10	25.13 m (82 ft 5 1/4 in)	Anthonett Nabwe	Liberia	13 March 2026	Fayetteville	
11	25.07 m (82 ft 3 in) A	Brooke Andersen	United States	4 February 2023	State College	
12	24.94 m (81 ft 9 3/4 in)	Jasmine Mitchell	United States	11 March 2022	Birmingham	
13	24.78 m (81 ft 3 1/2 in) A	Amber Campbell	United States	25 February 2012	Albuquerque	
13	24.78 m (81 ft 3 1/2 in)	Annette Echikunwoke	United States	16 February 2018	Columbus	
15	24.49 m (80 ft 4 in)	Giovanna Meeks	United States	13 February 2026	Fayetteville	
16	24.46 m (80 ft 2 3/4 in)	Erin Gilreath	United States	25 February 2005	Boston	
17	24.40 m (80 ft 1/2 in)	Phethisang Makhethe	South Africa	13 March 2026	Fayetteville	
18	24.37 m (79 ft 11 1/4 in)	Kaitlyn Long	United States	24 February 2018	Geneva	
19	24.24 m (79 ft 6 1/4 in)	Jeneva Stevens	United States	19 January 2018	Nashville	
20	24.22 m (79 ft 5 1/2 in) A	Felisha Johnson	United States	4 March 2017	Albuquerque	
21	24.21 m (79 ft 5 in)	Candice Scott	Trinidad and Tobago	27 February 2005	Fayetteville	
22	24.06 m (78 ft 11 in)	Stamatía Skarvélis	Greece	23 February 2019	Fayetteville	
22	24.06 m (78 ft 11 in)	Camryn Rogers	Canada	11 March 2022	Birmingham	
24	24.05 m (78 ft 10 3/4 in)	Janee' Kasanavoid	United States	21 January 2022	Manhattan	
25	24.04 m (78 ft 10 1/4 in)	Jennifer Dahlgren	Argentina	10 March 2006	Fayetteville	
25	24.04 m (78 ft 10 1/4 in) A	Jessica Ramsey	United States	4 March 2017	Albuquerque	

===== Notes =====
Below is a list of additional (indoor) performances (excluding ancillary throws) equal or superior to 24.11 m:

- Gwen Berry also threw 25.27 m (82 ft 10 3/4 in) (2018), 24.85 m (81 ft 6 1/4 in) (2018), 24.77 m (81 ft 3 in) (2017), 24.70 m (81 ft 1/4 in) (2013), 24.51 m (80 ft 4 3/4 in) (2016) and 24.39 m (80 ft 0 in) (2014).
- Brittany Riley also threw 25.34 m (83 ft 1 1/2 in) (2008), 25.12 m (82 ft 4 3/4 in) (2012), 24.57 m (80 ft 7 1/4 in) (2007) and 24.35 m (79 ft 10 1/2 in) (2012).
- Shey Taiwo also threw 25.19 m (82 ft 7 1/2 in) (2022).
- Janeah Stewart also threw 25.08 m (82 ft 3 1/4 in) (2019), 25.05 m (82 ft 2 in) (2020), 24.82 m (81 ft 5 in) (2019), 24.80 m (81 ft 4 1/4 in) (2019), 24.62 m (80 ft 9 1/4 in) (2020), 24.58 m (80 ft 7 1/2 in) (2020), 24.29 m (79 ft 8 1/4 in) (2024) and 24.20 m (79 ft 4 3/4 in) (2023).
- Brooke Andersen also threw 24.97 m (81 ft 11 in) (2023), 24.53 m (80 ft 5 1/2 in) (2024), 24.35 m (79 ft 10 1/2 in) (2024).
- Erin Reese also threw 24.93 m (81 ft 9 1/4 in) (2021), 24.34 m (79 ft 10 1/4 in) (2023).
- Jalani Davis also threw 24.84 m (81 ft 5 3/4 in) (2026), 24.80 m (81 ft 4 1/4 in) (2024), 24.63 m (80 ft 9 1/2 in) (2023), 24.51 m (80 ft 4 3/4 in) A (2023).
- DeAnna Price also threw 24.71 m (81 ft 3/4 in) (2020), 24.57 m (80 ft 7 1/4 in) (2019), 24.52 m (80 ft 5 1/4 in) (2019), 24.51 m (80 ft 4 3/4 in) (2018) and 24.30 m (79 ft 8 1/2 in) A (2017).
- Amber Campbell also threw 24.70 m (81 ft 1/4 in) (2010), 24.54 m (80 ft 6 in) (2007), 24.43 m (80 ft 1 3/4 in) (2009), 24.33 m (79 ft 9 3/4 in) (2016) and 24.32 m (79 ft 9 1/4 in) (2010).
- Anthonett Nabwe also threw 24.67 m (80 ft 11 1/4 in) (2026) and 24.22 m (79 ft 5 1/2 in) (2025).
- Rachel Tanczos also threw 24.58 m (80 ft 7 1/2 in) (2023), 24.32 m (79 ft 9 1/4 in) (2024).
- Annette Echikunwoke also threw 24.56 m (80 ft 6 3/4 in) (2023).
- Oyesade Olatoye also threw 24.46 m (80 ft 2 3/4 in) (2019).
- Giovanna Meeks also threw 24.11 m (79 ft 1 in) (2026).

Note that Gwen Berry threw 24.35 m in 2016 but the performance was annulled due to violation of anti-doping procedures

=== Other international competitions ===
The event, held outdoors and indoors, is a World Championship and world record event in World Masters Athletics. Outdoors, it is also the final event of the Throws pentathlon. Masters athletics has different weight specifications for different age groups.

=== As an indoor event ===
The weight throw is an indoor track and field event, predominately in the US. The technique implemented to throw the weight is similar to that of the hammer throw in outdoor competition. In international competition, the men's weight is a 35 lb ball (25 for high school) with a D-ring or triangle handle attached directly to the weight. The technique in wide use is to start in a throwing circle with the thrower's back to the landing area. The weight is then swung overhead to gain momentum before transitioning into the spinning position. The thrower then turns heel to toe up to four times across the ring and toward the front of the circle. At the front of the circle, the thrower releases the weight over his/her shoulder and into the landing area. The landing area is a sector of 34.92° which is identical to the Hammer throw, Discus throw and Shot Put. Because of the demands of the landing area, USATF rules allow for the event as part of an indoor meet to be held outdoors. The world best for men is 25.41 m (outdoor) and 25.86 m (84 ft 10 in) (indoor) and is held by American Lance Deal. For women, who throw a weight of 20 lb, the world best is 24.57 m (80 ft 7 1/2 in) (outdoor) set by Brittany Riley of Southern Illinois University on 27 January 2007 and 25.60 m (indoor), by Gwen Berry, on 4 March 2017.

The weight throw event has had an enduring history in American track and field. It was a national championship event for men outdoors from 1878 to 1965. Despite the decline of such outdoor contests in the United States, the event has been a mainstay of the USA Indoor Track and Field Championships: the men's 35 lb event has been held from 1932 to present and a women's 20 lb weight throw event was introduced in 1991. The weight throw is also present on the event programme of the NCAA Men's and NCAA Women's Indoor Track and Field Championships.

The Superweight Throw uses implements similar in construction to the regular weight throw but with heavier implements. The heaviest of these is called the Ultraweight which for men can go to 300 pounds. The event was part of two Olympic Games in 1904 and 1920. Though no longer officially sanctioned by World Athletics, it still is contested as a novelty event at various competitions, including the USATF Master's Indoor Championship.
