= Grant Anderson (Highland games) =

British weightlifter

- Born: Dundee, Scotland
- Occupation(s): Highland Games competitor, Strongman, Olympic Weightlifting, Town planner
- Height: 6 ft 1 in (1.85 m)

Competition record

weightlifting

Representing Scotland

Commonwealth Games
Bronze medal – third place	1970 - Super Heavyweight - Combined	

Highland Games

Representing Scotland

World Highland Games Championships
Champion	World Highland Games Championships 1980	
Champion	World Highland Games Championships 1982	

USA Highland Games Championships - Santa Rosa
Champion	1979	
Champion	1981	
Champion	1982	
Champion	1983	
Champion	1984	

Grant Anderson is a former weightlifter and Highland Games competitor from Scotland. He won a bronze medal at the Commonwealth Games in 1970 in the heavyweight class of the weightlifting but was more prominent as a Highland Games competitor, in which capacity he won the inaugural World Highland Games Championships in 1980 in Los Angeles.

== Biography ==
Born in Dundee, Anderson was well educated and trained to become a town planner. As an amateur athlete he excelled in field athletics and strength-based sports and specialised in weightlifting. As a weightlifter he competed in the 1970 Commonwealth Games in the superheavyweight class, the first time that class had been introduced to the games, and won the bronze medal. He then began to compete as a Highland Games specialist against his namesake, but no relation, Bill Anderson. In 1979 he competed in the first ever Britain's Strongest Man, won by Geoff Capes, nominally as a well-known name on the Highland Games circuit than for his prowess as a weightlifter. The following year, in 1980, he won the inaugural World Highland Games Championships and came third in that event in 1981. In 1982 he won it a second time in Prestonpans, Scotland, underlying his status. In 1983 he broke Bill Anderson's fourteen-year-old record in the 22 lb hammer throw with a distance of 123 feet 8.5 inches (37.706 m).

=== Personal records ===
- Weight over bar – 25.5 kg (56 lb) over 5.00 metres (16 ft 5 in) (1978) (Former World Record)
- Scottish hammer throw (heavyweight) – 10 kg (22 lb) for 37.70 metres (123 ft 8 in) (1983) (Former World Record)
