= Inverness Highland Games =

Highland games event

The Inverness Highland Games (official name: City of Inverness Highland Games), is a Highland games event in the city of Inverness in the Scottish Highlands. Highland games were instituted in Inverness, on Thursday 28 September 1837 and continued on Friday 29 September. They were organised by the Northern Meeting. The Games took place in a field at the Longman, owned by Mr Wilson, who owned the Caledonian Hotel in Inverness.

The events competed for were, Throwing the Heavy Hammer (16 lbs), Throwing the Light Hammer (12 lbs), Putting the Stone (21 lbs), Hop, Step and Leap, Running High Leap, Long Foot Race (250 yards), Sack Race (100 yards) Wheelbarrow Race, Wrestling and Rifle Shooting.

As reported in the Inverness Courier, on Wednesday 4 October 1837, "Considering the novelty of public sports of this description in Inverness, the competitors acquitted themselves in a highly creditable manner".

The Northern Meeting held another Highland games at the Longman field in 1838, but there were no Games held in Inverness in 1839 nor in 1840.

In 1841, Highland games were revived at the Longman. They continued there until 1848, when they were moved to the Inverness Academy Park, in the town's Academy Street. In 1863, the Highland games were moved to the nearby Bell's Park, which is now called Farraline Park.

In 1864, the Highland games moved to a purpose-built stadium, called The Northern Meeting Park, in Ardross Street, Inverness.

On 1 August 1891, the newly formed North of Scotland Amateur Athletic Association, held their inaugural amateur Games within the Northern Meeting Park. On Thursday 17 September and Friday 18 September, the Northern Meeting also held their customary Games in the Park.

Other than during World War 1, annual Highland games, hosted by the Northern Meeting, continued at the Northern Meeting Park, until 1938, inclusive.

Following World War 2, the Northern Meeting did not hold any further Highland games. As local lairds no longer supported the traditional Highland games, the Northern Meeting Park was consequently sold to the Inverness Council.

In 2006 Inverness hosted the Masters World Championships which was being held in Europe for the first time. In 2007 Inverness hosted the World Highland Games Heavy Championships which was being staged on Scottish soil for the first time since it was staged in Kilmarnock in 1995. The World Championship was won by Gregor Edmunds of Scotland with Larry Brock and Ryan Vierra of the USA finishing in second and third positions. In 2009 the Masters World Championships returned to Inverness for the second time and took place the week before "The Gathering" celebrations organised as the centre piece of Scotland's Year of Homecoming.

== Organisation ==
Northern Meeting Park was the venue for Highland games organised in Inverness by the Northern Meeting Society from 1864 to 1938. Following this, it was agreed that the Inverness Shopkeepers Association would be invited to take over the running of the Games but plans for a September 1939 event was abandoned as a result of the outbreak of the Second World War. Organised by the North of Scotland Amateur Athletic Association, Highland games were staged in the Northern Meeting Park for a final time in 1948. The following year it was decided that they would be moved to Bught Park. Today the Games are organised by High Life Highland, on behalf of the Highland Council, in partnership with a Committee of volunteers. In 2010 the Games returned to the smaller Northern Meeting Park in preparation for celebrations to mark the 150th Anniversary of the World's oldest Highland games stadium in 2014.

The 2014 celebrations featured the introduction of a Strongman and Strongwoman's event and two Highland games in the same year for the first time. The regular Games were staged in July and the Masters World Championships were hosted in September. The September Games featured more Heavies than any other Games in history with 157 athletes from 14 countries taking part. The September Games ended with a Guinness World Record for Simultaneous Caber Tossing being established with 66 of the 110 Cabers thrown being successfully launched into the air at the same time and turning correctly. The following year a Gala Day was added to the Games weekend programme as the main Games returned down the River Ness to Bught Park where it is now based. In 2019 the Games weekend was expanded to include the Proud Ness LGBT Community Gathering which was attended by 10,000. The Games were cancelled in 2020 due to the COVID-19 pandemic.
