= Scottish hammer throw =

Sport

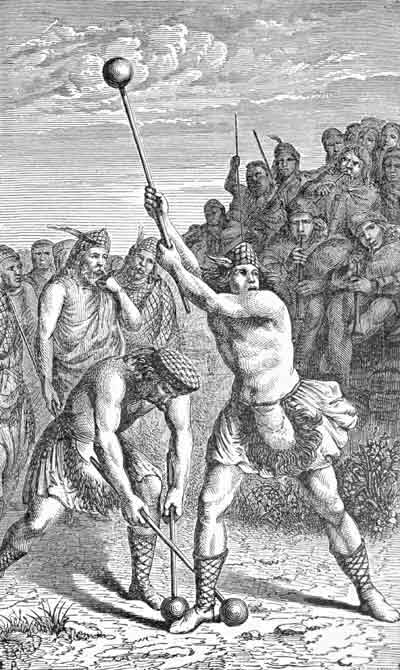
Scottish hammer throw illustration from Frank R. Stockton's book Round-about Rambles in Lands of Fact and Fancy.

Scottish hammer throw is a traditional throwing event derived from ancient Scottish Highland games. It involves heaving of an implement consisting of a wooden handle with a spherical weight attached to one end of it as far as possible.

== History, implement and technique ==
The event dates back centuries and is regarded the precursor to the modern track and field Hammer throw seen at Olympic games. However, the traditional Scottish hammer throw has distinct differences in both the implement and the technique.

The implement consists of a metal sphere weighing 16 lb (7 kg) or 22 lb (10 kg) for men, and 12 lb (5 kg) or 16 lb (7 kg) for women, which is attached to the end of a shaft about 4 feet (1.2 metres) long made primarily of wood or occasionally bamboo, rattan or plastic.

With their back facing the field and feet in a fixed position, competitors whirl the hammer around their head once, twice or thrice and throw it over the shoulder, twisting the upper body nearly 180 degrees. Hammer throwers sometimes employ specially designed footwear with flat blades to dig into the turf to maintain their balance and resist the centrifugal forces of the implement as they whirl it. This substantially increases the attainable distance and is allowed by all Highland games federations.

== World records ==
- 7.3 kg (16 lb) light hammer for 48.03 metres (157 ft 7 in) by Daniel McKim (United States) (2014 Utah Highland Games)
- 10 kg (22 lb) heavy hammer for 40.31 metres (132 ft 3 in) by Daniel McKim (United States) (2014 Utah Highland Games)

Holding both records, McKim arguably is the greatest of all time at this event. Some other all-time greats who have held both records are Matt Sandford, Stephen King and Bill Anderson.

=== Progression of the world records ===
==== 7.3 kg (16 lb) light hammer ====
Distance	Holder	Year	Location
46.08 metres (151 ft 2 in)	(Scotland) Bill Anderson	1969	Lochearnhead, Scotland
46.66 metres (153 ft 1 in)	(Scotland) Bruce Aitken	1997	Pitlochry, Scotland
46.68 metres (153 ft 2 in)	(Scotland) Stephen King	1998	Inverary, Scotland
47.22 metres (154 ft 11 in)	(Australia) Matt Sandford	1998	Halkirk, Scotland
47.62 metres (156 ft 3 in)	(Australia) Matt Sandford	1999	Estes Park, Colorado, USA
47.76 metres (156 ft 8 in)	(Scotland) Bruce Aitken	2000	Aberdeenshire, Scotland
48.03 metres (157 ft 7 in)	(United States) Daniel McKim	2014	Salt Lake City, Utah, USA

==== 10 kg (22 lb) heavy hammer ====
Distance	Holder	Year	Location
37.61 metres (123 ft 5 in)	(Scotland) Bill Anderson	1969	Crieff, Scotland
37.70 metres (123 ft 8 in)	(Scotland) Grant Anderson	1983	Santa Rosa, California, USA
38.13 metres (125 ft 1 in)	(Scotland) Stephen King	1998	Inverary, Scotland
39.58 metres (129 ft 10 in)	(Australia) Matt Sandford	1998	Halkirk, Scotland
39.61 metres (129 ft 11 in)	(United States) Daniel McKim	2014	New Mexico, USA
40.31 metres (132 ft 3 in)	(United States) Daniel McKim	2014	Salt Lake City, Utah, USA

== See also ==
- Hammer throw
