= The Gathering 2009 =

Two-day event celebrating Scottish culture

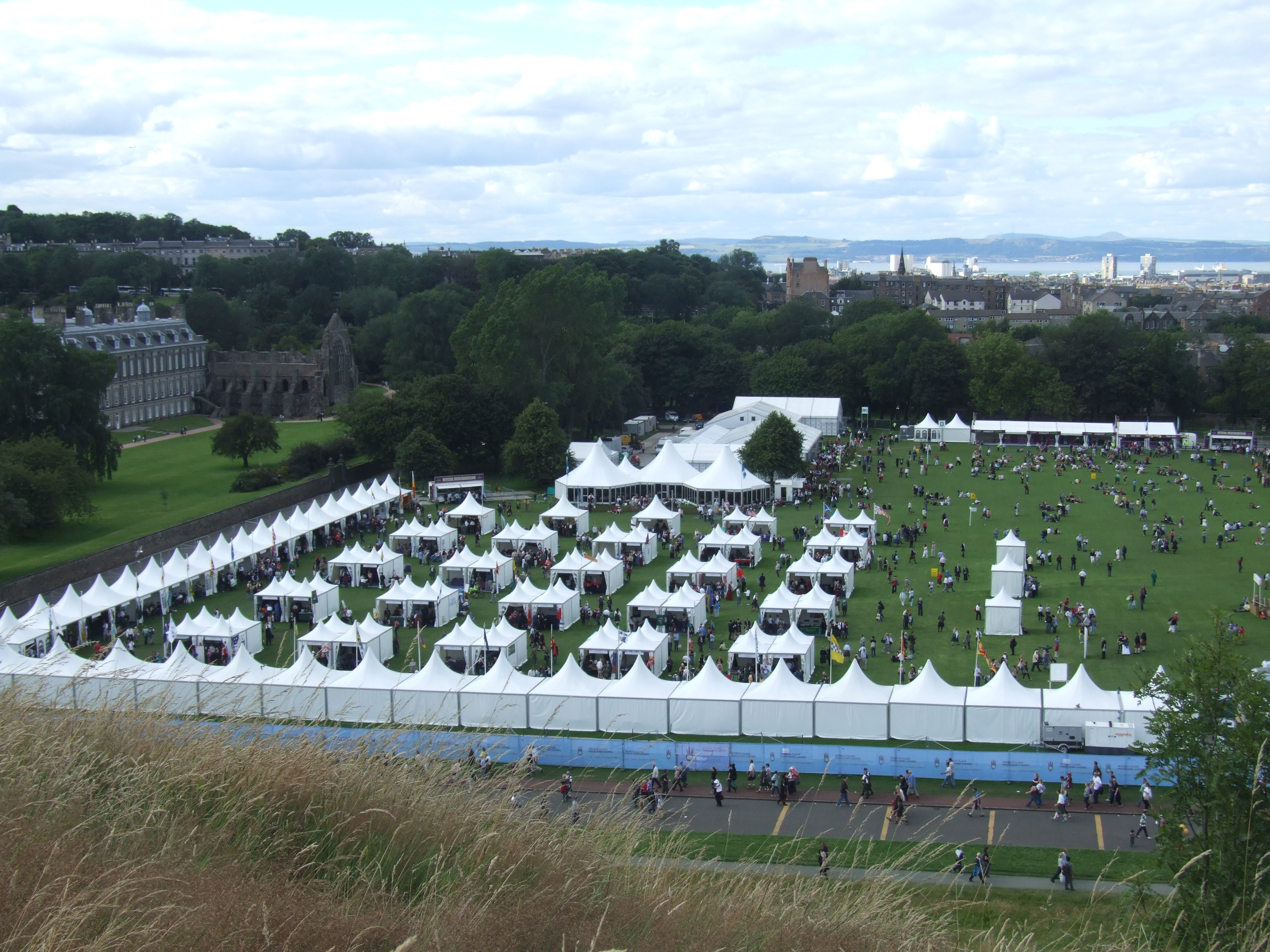
The 'clan village' at The Gathering.

The Gathering 2009 was a two-day weekend event, celebrating Scottish culture, held between 25 and 26 July 2009, as part of Homecoming 2009. The event was held at Holyrood Park, Scotland, and attracted around 47,000 people from all over the world. Over 125 Scottish clans were represented in what was described as the largest Highland Games in Scotland's history. A clan convention also took place, also the largest recorded meeting of chiefs.

However, despite being initially hailed as a success, subsequent revelations that the organisers had overseen a £600,000 loss led to the event's finances being described as a fiasco in the Scottish Press.

== Festivities ==
Thankfully in 2009 the lives of clan chiefs and their clansmen, both in Scotland and abroad, are somewhat less blood-soaked and unhappy than those experienced by thousands of their ancestors.

— The Duke of Rothesay

The Gathering took place at Holyrood Park between 25 and 26 July. On the evening of 25 July, about 20,000 people lined the Royal Mile and watched the parade of about 8,000 clan members and pipe bands march from the Palace of Holyroodhouse to Edinburgh Castle Esplanade. The Duke of Rothesay officially opened the weekend event, which attracted over 47,000 people from at least 40 different countries. 125 Scottish clans were represented and 85 clan chiefs were also present. Visitors enjoyed traditional Highland Games, piping, dancing, live music performances, and sampled Scottish food, drink, as well as crafts and textiles. The majority of the weekend visitors attended the festivities on the 25th, with about 30,000 enjoying the sunshine, while rain the next day dampened the mood of some attendees.

The event was reported to have been the world's largest Highland Games and clan meeting. It was not, however, a sell out. The day before the festivities, 7,400 out of 8,100 tickets that guaranteed access to the parade and esplanade had been sold. The cost of such tickets was £95 a piece. Also, only 12,000 tickets out of 30,000 had been sold for the event held in Holyrood Park.

=== Clan convention ===
A Clan Convention was held on 24 July 2009, located at the Scottish Parliament. The convention was made up of more than 100 clan chiefs and about 300 other people. The meeting of chiefs was the first of such scale in recorded history. One of the points discussed at the convention was the use of social networking to reach young people. About 40 clan chiefs were not present for the convention; and it was noted that a minority of chiefs refuse to participate in clan functions.

=== Financial losses ===
Poor advance ticket sales and a failure to keep costs down led to the event taking a £600,000 loss. The organisers failed to pay Historic Scotland £73,000 for the use of Edinburgh Castle and Holyrood Park. Debts of £27,200 owed to the police and £12,000 to the ambulance service were unpaid, as was £24,000 to Edinburgh City Council to facilitate the closing of the Royal Mile for the clan parade. £300,000 of debts owed to various contractors, suppliers and performers were also unmet.

The Scottish Government, which gave The Gathering £280,000 from its own budget and those of EventScotland and Homecoming, was also forced to write off a £180,000 loan agreed just weeks before the event to ensure it went ahead as planned.

The Gathering 2009 Ltd also made a £38,000 loan to another firm, Panalba, partly owned by Lord Sempill and "similar people" to The Gathering 2009 Ltd which was also written off.

== Conclusion ==
Initially The Gathering 2009 was deemed a success by both the organisers and media. Afterwards, Lord Sempill, the co-director of the event with Jennifer Gilmour, was quoted in the press as saying, "This tremendous event has not only been everything I dreamed but has exceeded my expectations. It has been wonderful to see so many local people". Subsequently, however, Lord Sempill handed over intellectual property rights to the Destination Edinburgh Marketing Alliance as part of the deal whereby Historic Scotland was forced to write off the money owed to it by The Gathering Ltd.

Initially The Gathering's apparent success led to speculation over future events, possibly in connection with the 700th anniversary of the Battle of Bannockburn in 2014. The Destination Edinburgh Marketing Alliance however has subsequently stated that they intend instead to run a tie-in with the London Olympics in 2012.

== See also ==
- Highland games
- Homecoming Scotland 2009
- Scottish clan
- World Highland Games Championships
