= Spencer Tyler =

American athlete

- Known for: Highland games
- Height: 193 cm (6 ft 4 in)

Spencer Tyler is an American professional Highland games athlete from Liberty Hill, Texas.

== Career ==
Tyler was a collegiate track and field athlete before his coach Quint Melius recommended him Highland games. He gradually excelled in the sport and became the World Highland Games Champion when he won 2019 World Highland Games Championships held in Lincoln, New Hampshire.

Tyler is considered to be one of the greatest Highland games athletes ever, and is the current world record holder in the 20 lb (9.1 kg) Sheaf toss with a clearance of 37 ft 1 in (11.30 m) at 2019 Chicago Highland Games, and both the 28 lb (12.7 kg) (lightweight) and 56 lb (25.4 kg) (heavyweight) Weight throw event with distances of 97 ft 7.5 in (29.76 m) and 51 ft 3 in (15.62 m) respectively.

He is also the World Highland Games record holder at the Weight over bar event when he heaved the 56 lb (25.4 kg) weight over 19 ft 5 in (5.92 m) in 2019. Only the all-time world record holder Hafþór Júlíus Björnsson has thrown higher.

== Personal records ==
- Sheaf toss – 20 lb (9.1 kg) over 37 ft 1 in (11.30 m) (2019 Chicago Highland Games) (World Record)
- Weight throw (lightweight) – 28 lb (12.7 kg) for 97 ft 7.5 in (29.76 m) (2019 US Invitational Pleasanton) (World Record)
- Weight throw (heavyweight) – 56 lb (25.4 kg) for 51 ft 3 in (15.62 m) (2019 New Hampshire Highland Games) (World Record)
- Weight over bar – 56 lb (25.4 kg) over 19 ft 5 in (5.92 m) (2019 World Championships) (World Highland Games Record)
- Discus throw – 4.4 lb (2.0 kg) for 184 ft 11.5 in (56.38 m) (2006 in Abilene)
- Javelin throw – 1.76 lb (0.8 kg) for 156 ft 10 in (47.80 m) (2007 in Austin)
- Hammer throw – 16 lb (7.3 kg) for 155 ft 6 in (47.40 m) (2007 in Commerce)
- Shot put – 16 lb (7.3 kg) for 53 ft 6 in (16.31 m) (2007 in Stephenville)

== Personal life ==
Tyler has three daughters and is married to Sebastiana Tyler. They live in Libert Hill, Texas.
