= David P. Webster =

Scottish author (1928–2023)

David P. Webster OBE
- Born: David Pirie Webster; 18 September 1928
- Died: 18 October 2023 (aged 95)
- Occupations: Author, historian, sports promoter
- Known for: Organising the World Highland Games Championships

David Pirie Webster, OBE (18 September 1928 – 18 October 2023) was a Scottish author, historian, and sports promoter living in Glasgow. Webster was the organiser of the Highland Games around the world for over 50 years.

== Life and career ==
David Pirie Webster was born on 18 September 1928. He completed a degree in physical education at Teachers Training College, in Aberdeen, and as a public school teacher before turning to community recreation and sports promotion work in Scotland. As an author, Webster published hundreds of articles in a wide variety of academic and popular journals.

Webster was the Chairman of Scottish Weightlifting, and served as the Scottish weightlifting national coach, as well as referee, and competitor in that sport. He attended the 1960, 1968, and 1972 Olympics as part of the Scottish delegation and worked at the World & European Championships every year from 1961 to 1966 as either a technical official, referee, or coach. Webster was coach of the British team at the Commonwealth Weightlifting Championships in Malta in 1983, and he also served for many years as Scottish National Weightlifting Coach. Webster also competed in weightlifting and in the sport of powerlifting. Webster was also an official in bodybuilding, and was a founding member of the National Amateur Bodybuilding Association (NABBA).

In the 1995 Birthday Honours, Webster was appointed an Officer of the Order of the British Empire (OBE) for services to sport.

David P. Webster died from complications of dementia on 18 October 2023, at the age of 95.

== Highland Games and World Highland Games Heavy Events Championships ==
In the 1960s, Webster began promoting the Highland games internationally as a way to bring tourists to Scotland and helped to revive some of the traditional Scottish sports such as stone-lifting and caber-tossing. He founded the World Highland Games Heavy Events Championships in 1980. The Championships has now been held in New Zealand, Canada, USA, Finland, Australia, Nigeria, and Scotland. The 2009 Championships, held in Scotland, was attended by 47,000 people including Charles, Duke of Rothesay, Camilla, Duchess of Rothesay, and many civic leaders. In 2013, Webster was invited to California at the request of former governor Arnold Schwarzenegger for the commencement of Arnold Highland Games as part of the Arnold Classic.

== Strongman ==
Webster promoted the first televised strongman contest in 1955, which consisted the elements of stone-lifting, powerlifting and weightlifting, and was later asked by Trans World International to serve as a consultant as they formed their World's Strongest Man television show in the late 1970s. Webster was also invited by Terry Todd to be part of the creation of the Arnold Strongman Classic, held annually as part of the Arnold Sports Festival in Columbus Ohio, US. He served as head official at that event for 14 years.

=== David Webster memorial weight toss ===
In 2024, the organizers of the 2024 Arnold UK Strongman competition paid a tribute to Webster by modifying the historical Highland games one arm weight over bar event with a sandbag and naming the event as David Webster memorial weight toss. It is also known as David Webster memorial one arm sandbag over bar. Iceland's Hafþór Júlíus Björnsson won the event with an inaugural world record of 25.5 kg (56 lb) over 5.79 metres (19 ft 0 in).

== Selected bibliography ==
- The Iron Game: An Illustrated History of Weightlifting (1976)
- Scottish Highland Games (1959)
- Complete Physique Book (1963)
- Lifting Illustrated (1966)
- The Development of the Clean And Jerk (1967)
- Bodybuilding—An Illustrated History (1982)
- Sons of Samson, Volume 1: PROfiles (1993)
- Sons of Samson, Volume 2: PROfiles (1997)
- Donald Dinnie: The First Sporting Superstar (1999)
- World History of Highland Games (2011)
