= World Highland Games Championships =

Tournament information
- Location: Varies (last held in Windsor, Maine, USA)
- Established: 1980
- Format: Multi-event competition

Current champion
- (Czech Republic) Vladislav Tuláček (2025)

The World Highland Games Championships is an annual Highland Games championships organised by David Webster, OBE of Scotland. It is regarded the pinnacle of modern day Highland Games.

A roll of past competitors includes world's greatest strength athletes with former World's Strongest Man winners, Olympians, Commonwealth Games medal winners, Guinness World Records holders, physique champions, and continental & national titleholders in various sports.

The World Highland Games Championships consist of traditional events and are in this sense differentiated from many of the other international strength athletic competitions, including Highlander World Championships.

== History ==
The World Highland Games Championships were first held in 1980 and were created as an attempt to identify who was truly the greatest Highland Games competitor. Many of the Highland Games competitions around the world have traditionally not been invitational, in the sense that novices can step up to compete, or at the more established events, the competitors were very much more selected from the nation in which the competition was held.

The world's introduced a formalization of the requirements for entry and a truly international flavour. Since the passing of David Webster in 2023, the responsibility of managing and directing the World Highland Games Championships was transferred to Steve Conway and Dr. Bill Crawford. Tommy De Bruijn and Thomas Kincaid are also current prominent figures within the championships' management.

Over the years competitors have been drawn from the disciplines of field athletics, including the shot put, discus and hammer throw, as well as strength athletes and dedicated Highland Games specialists.

In the history of the championships, there have been 21 champions representing five countries, with four men each having won the title five times, Geoff Capes, Jim McGoldrick, Ryan Vierra and Matt Sandford, and one of those, Capes having also won the 1981 World Highland Games Championships held in Lagos, which would make him six times world champion, although this is not listed on the official website.

== List of champions ==
List information taken from this source.

Year	Champion	Location
1980	(Scotland) Grant Anderson	Los Angeles, California, United States
1981	(England) Geoff Capes	Lagos, Nigeria
1981	(Scotland) Bill Anderson	Melbourne, Australia
1982	(Scotland) Grant Anderson	Prestonpans, Scotland
1983	(England) Geoff Capes	Carmunnock, Scotland
1984	(England) Geoff Capes	Carmunnock, Scotland
1985	(England) Geoff Capes	Carmunnock, Scotland
1986	(England) Geoff Capes	Carmunnock, Scotland
1987	(England) Geoff Capes	Clarkston, Scotland
1988	(United States) Jim McGoldrick	Aviemore, Scotland
1989	(United States) Jim McGoldrick	Aviemore, Scotland
1990	(United States) Jim McGoldrick	Glasgow, Scotland
1991	(United States) Jim McGoldrick	Callander, Scotland
1992	(Australia) Jo Quigley	Callander, Scotland
1993	(United States) Jim McGoldrick	Callander, Scotland
1994	(Scotland) George Patience	Callander, Scotland
1995	(Scotland) Alistair Gunn	Kilmarnock, Scotland
1996	(United States) Ryan Vierra	Waipu, New Zealand
1997	(United States) Ryan Vierra	(United States) Fredericksburg, Virginia
1998	(United States) Ryan Vierra	Oulu, Finland
1999	(Australia) Matt Sandford	(United States) Pleasanton, California
2000	(Australia) Matt Sandford	Waipu, New Zealand
2001	(Australia) Matt Sandford	(United States) Pleasanton, California
2002	(Australia) Matt Sandford	(United States) Pleasanton, California
2003	(Australia) Matt Sandford	(Canada) Antigonish, Nova Scotia
2004	(Scotland) Bruce Aitken	Lincoln, New Hampshire, United States
2005	(United States) Ryan Vierra	Fergus, Canada
2006	(United States) Ryan Vierra	(United States) Pleasanton, California
2007	(Scotland) Gregor Edmunds	Inverness, Scotland
2008	(United States) Sean Betz	(United States) Bridgeport, West Virginia
2009	(Australia) Aaron Neighbour	Edinburgh, Scotland "Gathering of the Clans"
2010	(United States) Larry Brock	Victoria, Canada "30th Anniversary"
2011	(United States) Daniel McKim	Lincoln, New Hampshire, United States
2012	(United States) Matt Vincent	Fergus, Canada
2013	(United States) Daniel McKim	Lincoln, New Hampshire, United States
2014	(United States) Matt Vincent	Dunfermline, Scotland
2015	(United States) Daniel McKim	Bressuire, France
2016	(England) Scott Rider	Halkirk, Scotland
2017	(United States) Daniel McKim	Hank, Netherlands
2018	(United States) Chuck Kasson	Victoria, Canada
2019	(United States) Spencer Tyler	Lincoln, New Hampshire, United States
2022	(United States) John Van Beuren	Pleasanton, California, California, United States
2023	(United States) John Van Beuren	Fergus, Canada
2024	(United States) John Van Beuren	Glengarry, Canada
2025	(Czech Republic) Vladislav Tuláček	Maine, United States

- Source of the above information: Official World Championship site of the IHGF.

== Championships by country ==
Country	Gold
United States	21
Australia	7
England	7
Scotland	7
Czech Republic	1

== Repeat champions ==
Champion	Times
(England) Geoff Capes	6
(United States) Jim McGoldrick	5
(United States) Ryan Vierra	5
(Australia) Matt Sandford	5
(United States) Daniel McKim	4
(United States) John Van Beuren	3
(Scotland) Grant Anderson	2
(United States) Matt Vincent	2
