= Bill Anderson (strongman) =

Scottish sportsman (1937–2019)

Bill Anderson MBE
Personal information
- Born: William Smith Anderson; 6 October 1937 Bucksburn, Scotland
- Died: 12 August 2019 (aged 81)
- Occupation: Highland Games/Strongman
- Height: 6 ft 4 in (1.93 m)
Medal record
Highland Games
Representing Scotland
World Highland Games Championships
| Champion | World Highland Games Championships 1981 |
Scottish Highland Games Championships
| Champion | 1959 |
| Champion | 1960 |
| Champion | 1961 |
| Champion | 1962 |
| Champion | 1963 |
| Champion | 1964 |
| Champion | 1965 |
| Champion | 1966 |
| Champion | 1967 |
| Champion | 1968 |
| Champion | 1969 |
| Champion | 1970 |
| Champion | 1971 |
| Champion | 1972 |
| Champion | 1973 |
| Champion | 1974 |
USA Highland Games Championships
| Champion | 1976 |
| Champion | 1977 |
| Champion | 1978 |
| Champion | 1979 |
| Champion | 1980 |
Canadian Highland Games Championships
| Champion | 1977 |
Strongman
Representing Scotland
Britain's Strongest Man
| 2nd | 1979 Britain's Strongest Man |
Representing United Kingdom
World's Strongest Man
| 9th | 1979 World's Strongest Man |

William Smith Anderson MBE (6 October 1937 - 2 August 2019) was a Scottish Highland Games athlete. He won the World Highland Games Championships in 1981 and the Scottish Highland Games Championships 16 times. He also broke multiple world records and held every possible Scottish record in Highland Games.

== Biography ==
Anderson was born on Greenferns Farm, Bucksburn, close to Aberdeen in Scotland. He began competing as an 18-year-old at Alford in 1956 and went on to compete at the top of his sport, excelling at caber tossing and Hammer throwing.

=== Highland games ===
Anderson dominated the heavy events for three decades, winning 16 Scottish championship titles as well as British, European, American, Canadian and World championships.

Anderson claimed his first Scottish title in 1959 and he became the first man to hurl the light Scottish hammer 150 feet in 1969 at the Lochearnhead Games. His distance of 151 feet 2 inches (46.08 m) remained unbeaten for 28 years.

His heavy Scottish hammer record with the wooden shaft thrown from a standing position, at 1969 Crieff Games which measured 123 feet 5 inches (37.62 m) stood for 14 years. The one and only time he threw the wire hammer was on national service in Aden in 1957 when with a standing throw he reached 133 feet 0 inches (40.54 m).

Anderson also held both world records in the Weight throw simultaneously. His 87 feet 2 inches (26.57 m) with the light weight from 1966 Crieff games stood for 12 years while his 41 feet 11 inches (12.78 m) with the heavy weight from 1969 Aboyne Highland games also stood for 12 years.

Anderson also broke the Weight over bar world record 4 times with 15 feet 0 inches (4.57 m) in 1970, 15 feet 7 inches (4.75 m) in 1973 Braemar Gathering Games, and 16 feet 0 inches (4.88 m) and 16 feet 1 inch (4.90 m) both in 1977.

Even after retiring as a competitor, he remained active on the games circuit, judging at the Aberdeen, Crieff, Aboyne and Braemar Highland Games.

His biography, Highland Fling was published by Argyll Publishing.

=== Strongman ===
Anderson competed in the 1979 World's Strongest Man contest at the age of 42, but withdrew early in the competition due to an injury.

Anderson died on 12 August 2019.

== Accomplishments ==
- 1981 World Highland Games Championships Champion
- Four times World Caber Tossing Champion
- Winner of 16 Scottish Highland Games Championships
- Five times USA Highland Games Champion 1976–1980
- Canadian Highland Games Champion 1977

=== Personal records ===
- Weight over bar – 25.5 kg (56 lb) over 4.90 metres (16 ft 1 in) (1977) (Former World Record)
- Weight throw (lightweight) – 12.5 kg (28 lb) for 26.56 metres (87 ft 2 in) (1966) (Former World Record)
- Weight throw (heavyweight) – 25.5 kg (56 lb) for 12.77 metres (41 ft 11 in) (1969) (Former World Record)
- Scottish hammer throw (lightweight) – 7.3 kg (16 lb) for 46.08 metres (151 ft 2 in) (1969) (Former World Record)
- Scottish hammer throw (heavyweight) – 10 kg (22 lb) for 37.61 metres (123 ft 5 in) (1969) (Former World Record)

== Awards and honours ==
He was made a Member of the Order of the British Empire (MBE) in the 1977 New Year Honours by Queen Elizabeth II, for services to Highland Games.

Anderson was inducted into the Scottish Sports Hall of Fame in 2007.
