= Ryan Vierra =

American athlete (1968–2021)

- Born: Ryan Neil Vierra; August 23, 1968; Turlock, California, United States
- Died: February 26, 2021 (aged 52); Denair, California, United States
- Occupation: Highland Games
- Height: 6 ft 0 in (1.83 m)
- Spouse: Christina Vierra
- Children: Brooke Vierra, Faith Vierra, Cheyenne Vierra

Competition record

Highland Games

Representing United States

World Highland Games Championships
Champion	World Highland Games Championships 1996
Champion	World Highland Games Championships 1997
Champion	World Highland Games Championships 1998
2nd	World Highland Games Championships 1999
2nd	World Highland Games Championships 2000
2nd	World Highland Games Championships 2001
2nd	World Highland Games Championships 2002
2nd	World Highland Games Championships 2003
Champion	World Highland Games Championships 2005
Champion	World Highland Games Championships 2006
2nd	World Highland Games Championships 2007
3rd	World Highland Games Championships 2008

US National Championships
Champion	2001
Champion	2004
Champion	2005

US Invitational Championships
Champion	1995
Champion	1996
Champion	1997
Champion	1998
Champion	1999
Champion	2000
Champion	2001
Champion	2002
Champion	2003
Champion	2004
Champion	2005

Celtic Classic
Champion	1996
Champion	1997
Champion	1998
Champion	2000
Champion	2001
Champion	2002
Champion	2003
Champion	2004

Fredericksburg Highland Games Championships
Champion	1996
Champion	1997
Champion	1998
Champion	1999
Champion	2000

Scottish Championships
Champion	2004

Clash of the Celtic Giants
Champion	2005

Victoria Australian Championships
Champion	1995

World Stone Championships
Champion	1996
Champion	1997
Champion	2005
Champion	2006

World Hammer Championships
Champion	1997

International Games
Champion	1998

Canadian Highland Games Championships
Champion	1996
Champion	1998

USA vs. World
Champion	2000

World Weight Championships
Champion	1998

Ryan Neil Vierra (August 23, 1968 – February 26, 2021) was an American world champion Highland Games competitor. He was a five-time winner of the World Highland Games Championships, he was also an 11 time US national champion. Vierra set 346 games records, 4 world records, 10 North American & American records and 6 world championship records. He died on February 26, 2021 in his home in Denair, California, at the age of 52, having been suffering from prostate cancer for 13 months.

== Professional records ==
- 16 lbs open stone 59.5 ft (18.1 m)
- 17 lbs open stone 58.5 ft (17.8 m).
- 22 lbs Braemar stone 47.0 ft (14.3 m).
- 26 lbs Braemar stone 39.7 ft (12.1 m).
- 16 lbs hammer throw 156.5 ft (47.7 m).
- 22 lbs hammer throw 121.7 ft (37.1 m).
- 28 lbs for distance 93 1/2 ft.
- 56 lbs for distance 49.2 1/2 ft.
- 16 lbs sheaf toss 37.0 ft (11.3 m).
- 20 lbs sheaf toss 35.0 ft (10.7 m).
- 56 lbs weight for height 16.0 st. (18.0 1 sp)
- Caber toss (23 ft × 130 lbs) 12:00 × 2

== Strongman events ==
- Donanun stones for time 21.4 sec
- 98 lbs stone for distance 15.11 ft (4.61 m).
- 125 lbs stone for distance 12.9 ft (3.9 m).
- Flint stone (press overhead) 374 lbs.

== Personal records ==
- Power clean: 385 pounds
- Power snatch: 245 pounds (stopped going heavy in 1992)
- Jerk: 374 pounds
- Squat: 640 pounds (for a double -just knee raps and a belt)
- Jump shrugs: 600 × 2
- Deadlift: 535 pounds (stopped after high school, 1986)
- Bench press: 410 pounds

== Career wins ==
- 1st place - 254
- 2nd place - 60
- 3rd place - 19
- 4th place - 6
- 5th place - 4
- 7th place - 1
