= National Register of Historic Places listings in Scotland County, North Carolina =

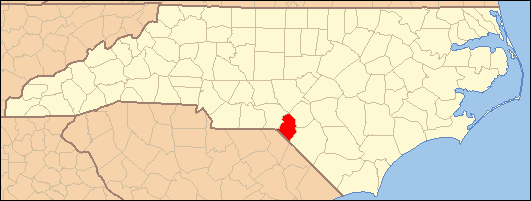

This list includes properties and districts listed on the National Register of Historic Places in Scotland County, North Carolina. Click the "Map of all coordinates" link to the right to view an online map of all properties and districts with latitude and longitude coordinates in the table below.

== Current listings ==
This National Park Service list is complete through NPS recent listings posted March 14, 2025.

	Name on the Register	Image	Date listed	Location	City or town	Description
1	John Blue House	John Blue House	December 8, 1978 (#78003192)	West of Laurinburg on SR 1108; 34°45′26″N 79°29′56″W	Laurinburg	
2	Mag Blue House	Mag Blue House	September 23, 1982 (#82003512)	West of Laurinburg on SR 1118; 34°46′06″N 79°30′44″W	Laurinburg	
3	Central School	Central School	January 20, 2005 (#04001525)	303 McRae St. 34°46′15″N 79°27′38″W	Laurinburg	
4	Dr. Evan Alexander Erwin House	Dr. Evan Alexander Erwin House	April 19, 2007 (#07000353)	520 S. Main St. 34°46′16″N 79°27′50″W	Laurinburg	
5	E. Hervey Evans House	E. Hervey Evans House	April 5, 2006 (#06000224)	400 W. Church St. 34°46′31″N 79°28′00″W	Laurinburg	
6	Thomas J. Gill House	Thomas J. Gill House	July 15, 1982 (#82003513)	203 Cronly St. 34°46′31″N 79°27′50″W	Laurinburg	
7	Laurel Hill Presbyterian Church	Laurel Hill Presbyterian Church	August 18, 1983 (#83001915)	SR 1321 and SR 1323; 34°49′56″N 79°27′54″W	Laurinburg	
8	Laurinburg Commercial Historic District	Laurinburg Commercial Historic District	December 10, 2003 (#03001274)	Roughly bounded by Church, Atkinson, Biggs Sts. and the Laurinburg and Southern RR; 34°46′34″N 79°27′45″W	Laurinburg	
9	McRae-McQueen House	McRae-McQueen House	November 25, 1980 (#80004469)	SW of Johns on US 501; 34°43′09″N 79°27′18″W	Johns	
10	Robert Nancy Monroe House		March 17, 1983 (#83001916)	SR 1328; 34°53′10″N 79°28′50″W	Silver Hill	
11	Richmond Temperance and Literary Society Hall		April 11, 1973 (#73001368)	1 miles SW of Wagram on SR 1405; 34°53′04″N 79°23′17″W	Wagram	
12	St. Andrews Presbyterian College	St. Andrews Presbyterian College	August 22, 2016 (#16000562)	1700 Dogwood Mile; 34°44′36″N 79°28′48″W	Laurinburg	
13	Shaw Family Farms	Shaw Family Farms	October 13, 1983 (#83003999)	SR 1405; 34°52′30″N 79°23′54″W	Wagram	
14	Stewart-Hawley-Malloy House	Stewart-Hawley-Malloy House	August 1, 1975 (#75001291)	SE of Laurinburg at jct. of SR 1610 and 1609; 34°44′35″N 79°25′01″W	Laurinburg	
15	Villa Nova	Villa Nova	August 26, 1982 (#82003514)	SR 1438; 34°46′26″N 79°25′30″W	Laurinburg	

== See also ==
- National Register of Historic Places listings in North Carolina
- List of National Historic Landmarks in North Carolina
