= Shaw House =

Shaw House or Shaw Farm may refer to:

== Singapore ==
- Shaw House and Centre, Singapore

== United Kingdom ==
- Shaw House, Berkshire, England
- Shaw House, Wiltshire, England

== United States ==
- Tillman Shaw House, Fort Smith, Arkansas
- Gould-Shaw House, Cloverdale, California, listed on the NRHP in Sonoma County
- Shaw House (Ferndale, California)
- Shaw Mansion (New London, Connecticut)
- Shaw-Van Gilder House, Paris, Illinois
- Col. William T. and Elizabeth C. Shaw House, Anamosa, Iowa
- E.A. Shaw House, Davenport, Iowa
- William M. Shaw House, Piscataquis County, Maine
- Shaw Mansion (Barton, Maryland)
- Thomas Mott Shaw Estate, Concord, Massachusetts
- Shaw–Hammons House, Anoka, Minnesota
- Cal Shaw Adobe Duplex, Tonopah, Nevada
- Cal Shaw Stone Row House, Tonopah, Nevada
- Shaw-Cude House, Colfax, North Carolina
- Shaw House (Shawboro, North Carolina)
- Shaw House (Southern Pines, North Carolina)
- Shaw Family Farms, Wagram, North Carolina
- Samuel Shaw Residence, Bath, Ohio, listed on the NRHP in Summit County
- Sylvester Shaw Residence, Bath, Ohio, listed on the NRHP in Summit County
- Shaw Farm (Ross, Ohio)
- Young-Shaw House, Sarahsville, Ohio
- Shaw–Dumble House, Hood River, Oregon
- Glenn W. Shaw House, Rapid City, South Dakota, listed on the NRHP in Pennington County
- Abner T. Shaw House, Goodlettsville, Tennessee
- Thomas and Marjorie Shaw House, Fort Worth, Texas, listed on the NRHP in Tarrant County
- Shaw House (Fairmont, West Virginia)
- Shaw Farm (Bayfield County, Wisconsin)

== See also ==
- Shaw Farm (disambiguation)
