= Shaw Farm =

Shaw Farm may refer to:

- Shaw Family Farms, Wagram, NC, listed on the NRHP in North Carolina
- Shaw Farm (Ross, Ohio), listed on the NRHP in Ohio
- Shaw Farm (Bayfield County, Wisconsin), listed on the NRHP in Wisconsin
- Shaw Farm, Windsor, part of the Crown Estate

== See also ==
- Shaw House (disambiguation)
