= Scottish Games in North Carolina =

Scottish Games in North Carolina may refer to:

- Grandfather Mountain Highland Games
- Scotland County Highland Games (North Carolina)
