= Shaw Mansion =

Shaw Mansion may refer to:

- Shaw Mansion (New London, Connecticut), listed on the NRHP in Connecticut
- Shaw Mansion (Barton, Maryland), listed on the NRHP in Maryland

== See also ==
- Shaw House (disambiguation)
