= MacTalla Mor =

Celtic Roots band formed in 2002 in Connecticut

- Origin: New Fairfield, Connecticut, United States
- Genres: Celtic, rock, blues, jazz, reggae, Latin, hip hop
- Years active: 2002–present
- Labels: Pine Hill Productions
- Members: Jesse Moses Devlin-Ofgang; Levon Devlin-Ofgang; Ilana Regina Devlin-Ofgang; Erik Devlin-Ofgang; Patty Devlin-Ofgang
- Website: www.mactalla.com

MacTalla Mor is a Celtic Roots band formed in 2002 in New Fairfield, Connecticut. The group blends traditional Gaelic music with rock, blues, jazz, reggae, Latin, and hip-hop influences. Composed entirely of members of the Devlin-Ofgang family, the band has performed at venues including Caesar’s Palace in Las Vegas, Central Park, and the Clearwater Festival, and has appeared on ESPN, NBC, and ABC television.

Since their inception MacTalla Mor has toured the United States and Canada. They have played at Caesars Palace Las Vegas, Grandfather Mountain Highland Games, for ESPN, ABC and NBC TV and at Pete Seeger's Clearwater Festival.

The band has released four CDs. The CD "The New Colossus" released in 2008, was recorded in at A-Pawling Studio in Pawling New York in 2007. The CD's title track The New Colossus is based on a sonnet of the same name by Emma Lazarus the final lines of which were engraved on a bronze plaque in the pedestal of the Statue of Liberty in 1912.

== Instrumentation ==
- Jesse Mo' Ofgang- Guitar, Vocals
- Levon Ofgang- Guitar, Vocals
- Ilana Regina Ofgang- Piano, Vocals
- Patty Devlin Ofgang- Bodhran, Vocals
- Erik "MageErik" Ofgang - Bass, Vocals

== Discography ==
- Piping Hot 2005
- No Man's Land 2006
- Jacob's Ladder 2007
- The New Colossus (2008, Pine Hill Productions) – includes a title track adapted from Emma Lazarus’s poem “The New Colossus,” known for the Statue of Liberty inscription.

== Awards and recognition ==
- The band received a Connecticut State Citation recognizing their contributions to Celtic culture at the Round Hill Highland Games.
