= Lorinza Harrington =

American basketball player (born 1980)

Personal information
- Born: October 2, 1980 (age 46) Wagram, North Carolina, U.S.
- Listed height: 6 ft 4 in (1.93 m)
- Listed weight: 190 lb (86 kg)

Career information
- High school: Scotland (Laurinburg, North Carolina)
- College: Wingate (1998–2002)
- NBA draft: 2002: undrafted
- Playing career: 2002–2014
- Position: Point guard / shooting guard
- Number: 6, 10

Career history
- 2002–2003: Denver Nuggets
- 2003: Dakota Wizards
- 2003–2004: Azovmash
- 2004–2005: New Orleans Hornets
- 2005–2006: Pamesa Valencia
- 2006–2007: Memphis Grizzlies
- 2007–2008: Lokomotiv Rostov
- 2009: Union Olimpija
- 2009–2010: Asseco Prokom Gdynia
- 2010–2011: Trefl Sopot
- 2011–2012: Anwil Wloclawek
- 2012–2013: Trefl Sopot
- 2014: Cóndores de Cundinamarca

Career highlights
- Polish Cup winner (2013); Polish League champion (2010); Slovenian League champion (2009); Slovenian Cup winner (2009); Ukrainian League champion (2004); SAC Player of the Year (2002); First-team All-SAC (2002)
- Stats at NBA.com
- Stats at Basketball Reference

Lorinza "Junior" Harrington Jr. (born October 2, 1980) is an American former professional basketball player.

== Pro career ==
The 6-foot-4-inch (1.93 m) guard from North Carolina's Wingate University began his professional career as an undrafted free agent with the Denver Nuggets, for whom he played all 82 games during the 2002–03 NBA season.

He has played professionally in the NBA, the Continental Basketball Association (CBA), Spain, Ukraine, Russia and Slovenia.

During his time in the NBA with the Denver Nuggets, New Orleans Hornets, and Memphis Grizzlies, he played a total of 140 games averaging 5.2 points per game, 3.1 assists and 2.7 rebounds per game.

In February 2007, Harrington was signed to a 10-day contract by the Memphis Grizzlies. Harrington's final NBA game was played on April 18, 2007, in a 116 - 94 win over the Minnesota Timberwolves where he recorded 2 points, 5 assists and 3 blocks.

In January 2009, Harrington was signed until end of the season by the Euroleague club Union Olimpija.
