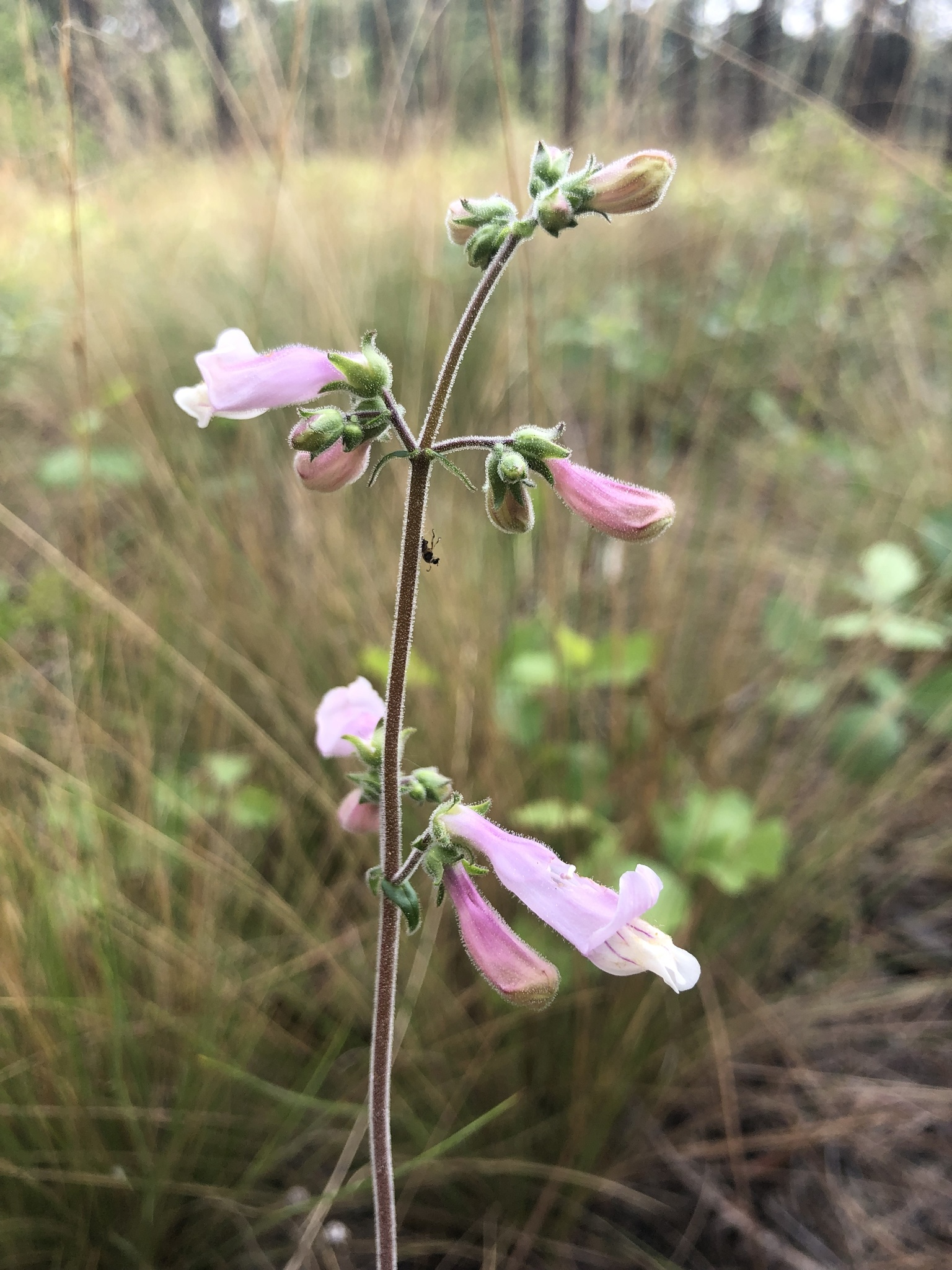
- Penstemon australis flowering near Wagram, North Carolina

Conservation status
- Secure (NatureServe)

Scientific classification
- Kingdom: Plantae
- Clade: Tracheophytes
- Clade: Angiosperms
- Clade: Eudicots
- Clade: Asterids
- Order: Lamiales
- Family: Plantaginaceae
- Genus: Penstemon
- Species: P. australis

Binomial name
- Penstemon australis Small

= Penstemon australis =

Plant species in the plantain family

Penstemon australis is a perennial plant native to the southeastern United States, with the common name Eustis Lake penstemon. It mainly grows in dry, sandy soils on the coastal plains.

== Description ==
Penstemon australis is a herbaceous plant that grows between 30 and 86 centimeters (12 and 34 inches) tall. The flowering stems are retrorsely hairy, having stiff, backwards facing, woolly, glandular hairs. Plants may have one or many stems that grow from a basal rosette of leaves and have both basal and cauline leaves, ones at the base of the plant and ones attached to the stems.

The leaves are usually retrorsely hairy like the stems, and sometimes also woolly-glandular, but in rare cases may be nearly hairless. The basal and lower cauline leaves measure 32–130 millimeters (1 1/4–5 inches) long by 7–40 mm (1/4–1 1/2 in) wide. Their shape varies between spatulate and oblanceolate, spoon shaped or like a reversed spear head, with a tapering base and a rounded to widely pointed end. The edges of the leaves may be smooth or more or less toothed. The stems will have five to eight pairs of leaves, somewhat smaller higher up, with a tapered base that may clasp the stem. The edges of the cauline leaves often have red edges.

The thyrses will be 7 and 26 cm (3 and 10 in) long with three to six widely spaced groups of flowers. Each one of the paired cymes, the branched sub-groups of flowers, will have two to six flowers. Usually one of the branches is much longer than the others with the rest nearly attaching directly to the main stem. Penstemon australis has pink to rose-purple tubular flowers with two lips. The upper lip has two lobes while the lower one has three. The nectar guides are dark purple. The inside of the flower is white-lanate, covered with woolly hairs. The flower is 20–25 mm (3/4–1 in) long. Flowering occurs from March through June.

== Taxonomy ==
Penstemon australis is in the family Plantaginaceae in the Penstemon genus. It was scientifically described and named by John Kunkel Small in 1903.

=== Names ===
Penstemon australis has many common names in English including Eustis Lake Penstemon, Eustis Lake beardtongue, pink beardtongue, sandhill beardtongue, slender beardtongue, slender penstemon, and southern beardtongue.

== Range and habitat ==
The species is native to the southeastern United states from Virginia to Florida and as far west as Tennessee and Mississippi. It is very common on the coastal plains of North Carolina, South Carolina, and Georgia. It also grows in the northern half of the Florida peninsula as well as the panhandle. It is found in much more widely scattered locations in Alabama, Tennessee, and Kentucky. Likewise it is found in just 13 Virginian counties, mostly in the southern half of the state. The USDA Natural Resources Conservation Service PLANTS database does not record an exact location for occurrences in Mississippi.

Dry, sandy soils are required by Penstemon australis, mostly on the coastal plains. It is associated with scrub oak and pine barrens. In central Georgia it grows in areas with soils derived from granite.

== Conservation ==
As of October 2024, NatureServe listed Penstemon australis as Secure (G5) worldwide. This status was last reviewed on 4 August 1988. It is listed as Critically Imperiled (S1) in Virginia.

== See also ==
List of Penstemon species
