= Harriet McBryde Johnson =

American attorney and disability rights activist

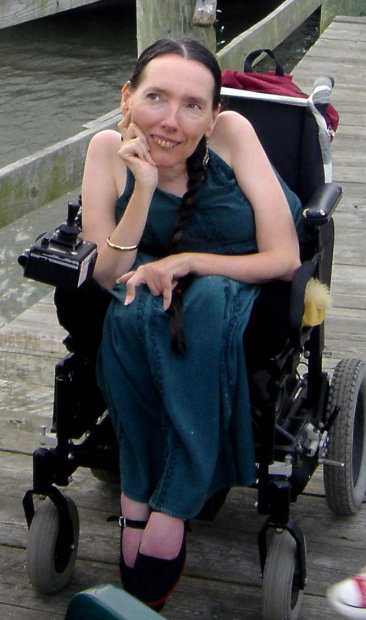
Harriet McBryde Johnson

Harriet McBryde Johnson (July 8, 1957 – June 4, 2008) was an American author, attorney, and disability rights activist. She was disabled due to a neuromuscular disease and used a motorized wheelchair.

== Biography ==
Harriet McBryde Johnson was born in eastern North Carolina, July 8, 1957, in Laurinburg, one of five children by David and Ada Johnson. Her parents were college teachers. She was active in addressing injustice even as a child: A quote from her sister said that "Harriet tried to get an abusive teacher fired; the start of her hell raising." She lived most of her life in Charleston, South Carolina. She earned a bachelor's degree in history from Charleston Southern University (1978), a master's degree in public administration from the College of Charleston (1981), and a J.D. degree from the University of South Carolina (1985).

In 2002, Johnson debated philosopher and bioethicist Peter Singer, challenging his belief that parents ought to be able to euthanize their disabled children. She went to the lecture by Singer on behalf of 'Not Dead Yet', a national disability-rights organization. Unspeakable Conversations, Johnson's account of her encounters with Singer and the pro-euthanasia movement, was published in The New York Times Magazine in 2003. It served as an unauthorized inspiration for The Thrill, a 2013 play by Judith Thompson partly based on Johnson's life.An authorized play on the exchange entitled Unspeakable Conversations by playwright Christian O'Reilly was produced for the Galway International Arts Festival in 2024. It was directed by Olwen Fouéré and starred disability actors and activists Mat Fraser and Liz Carr.

She published a memoir, Too Late to Die Young: Nearly True Tales From a Life, in 2005 and a YA coming-of-age novel, Accidents of Nature, in 2006. An important article that she wrote for The New York Times was titled "The Disability Gulag." In this article, Johnson described institutions where "wheelchair people are lined up, obviously stuck where they're placed" while "a TV blares, watched by no one." Johnson called for reform for disabled people. She wanted disabled people to be placed in publicly financed home care provided by family, friends or neighbors, and not institutions.

During Johnson's career as an attorney, she specialized in helping clients who could not work in receiving Social Security benefits. She was also chairwoman of the Charleston County Democratic Party. She once described herself as a "disabled, liberal, atheistic Democrat". In an interview with The New York Times, Johnson jokingly described herself as "a bedpan crip" and "a jumble of bones in a floppy bag of skin."

Johnson expressed support for Congress during the controversial Terri Schiavo case. Regarding the attention her writings about the Terri Schiavo case received by the press, she commented:

It's frustrating to me that it boiled down in the popular discussion to a conflict between right-to-life and right-to-die. I don't think that's it at all. I think that we ought to analyze the case in terms of disability discrimination.

In 1990 she voiced her opposition to the annual Jerry Lewis Muscular Dystrophy Telethon. Johnson described the telethon as "the charity mentality" and decried its "pity-based tactics".

Johnson died in her sleep at home on June 4, 2008.

== Awards and honors ==
In 2003 Johnson was named Person of the Year by New Mobility.

== Published works ==
- Return to Cuba (May 1998)
- Power Dressing (December 1998)
- A Celebration for the Day of the Dead (October 1999)
- Conventional Wisdom (September 2000)
- Unspeakable Conversations, The New York Times, (February 16, 2003, also published in the book Disability Visibility: First-Person Stories from the Twenty-First Century by Alice Wong, 2020)
- The Disability Gulag, The New York Times, (November 2003)
- Johnson, Harriet McBryde (May 30, 2004). "Stairway to Justice". The New York Times.
- Not Dead at All: Why Congress was right to stick up for Terri Schiavo Slate (magazine), (March 23, 2005)
- Schiavo's Disability Rights, NPR, (March 2005)
- "Overlooked in the Shadows, The Washington Post, (March 2005)
- Too Late to Die Young: Nearly True Stories From a Life (2005, ISBN 9780805075946)
- Wheelchair Unbound, The New York Times, (April 2006)
- Accidents of Nature (2006 ISBN 978-0-8050-7634-9)
- Alas for Tiny Tim, He Became a Christmas Cliché, The New York Times, (December 25, 2006)
- 13 Questions," BBC Ouch!, BBC, (May 2008)
