= Mag Blue House =

Historic house in North Carolina, United States

- U.S. National Register of Historic Places
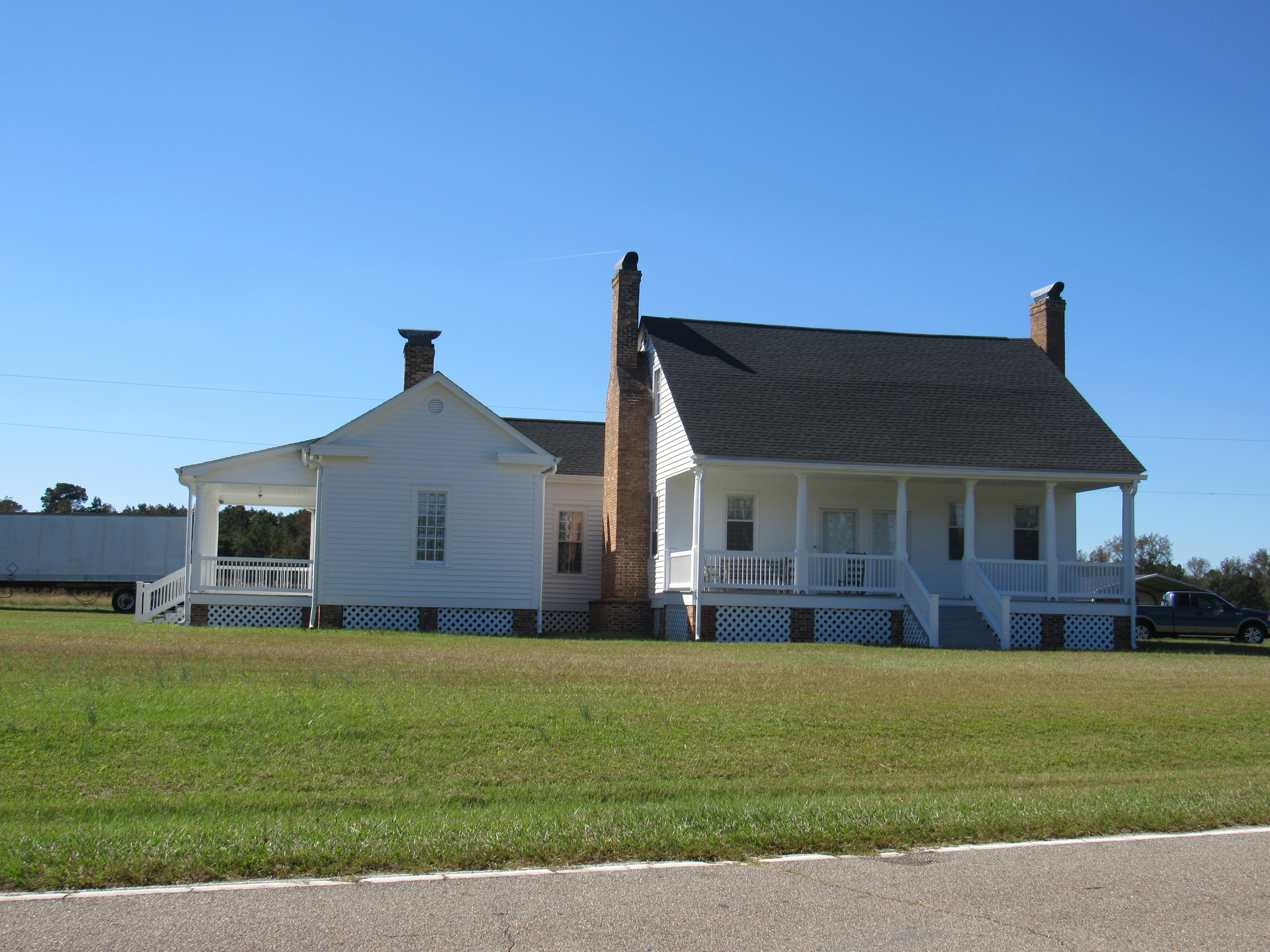

- Location within North Carolina Location within the United States
- Location: W of Laurinburg on SR 1118, Laurinburg, North Carolina
- Coordinates: 34°46′06″N 79°30′44″W
- Area: 62 acres (25 ha)
- Built: 1836
- Architectural style: Federal, Coastal Cottage
- NRHP reference No.: 82003512
- Added to NRHP: September 23, 1982

Mag Blue House is a historic home near Laurinburg, in Scotland County, North Carolina. It was constructed in 1836 and is an early example of the Coastal Cottage form with Federal-style decorative influences. The structure is a 1 1/2-story, five bay by three bay, timber-frame dwelling with a hall-and-parlor floor plan.

The house features a steeply pitched gable roof that extends outward to form a wide, sheltering front porch supported by simple wooden columns. Across the porch façade, the house is flush-sheathed, which was typical for the time period and region. A rear kitchen/dining wing projects from the main structure and is topped by a gabled roof. Decorative detailing is minimal but consistent with the Federal style, including finely executed corner boards, symmetrical proportions, and restrained interior millwork.

== History ==
The Mag Blue House is believed to have been built by early Scottish-descended settlers in the region, during a period of expanding agricultural development. Though no original construction records exist, oral histories passed down through local families have helped establish its age and early ownership lineage. The name "Mag Blue" is thought to be derived from a colloquial or family nickname, although the precise origin is unclear.

The house sat at the center of a once-active plantation estate and would have been a significant domestic structure in the rural landscape of the 19th-century Sandhills region. Over time, as agriculture shifted and modernization spread, the house remained largely untouched, preserving many of its original materials and features.

== Preservation ==
The Mag Blue House was added to the National Register of Historic Places on September 23, 1982, recognized for its architectural integrity and as a surviving example of early rural domestic architecture in southeastern North Carolina. In the decades since its listing, local preservationists have advocated for its ongoing care. The structure has undergone limited restoration work to stabilize its foundation, roofline, and porch. Any repairs have aimed to maintain historical accuracy, using period-appropriate materials and methods wherever possible.

It remains a subject of interest among local historians and is occasionally opened for heritage tours by regional preservation groups.

== Significance ==
The building stands as a rare representation of the fusion between Federal design elements and vernacular coastal forms. Its largely unaltered appearance provides valuable insight into early 19th-century life in the rural South. It also illustrates the influence of Scottish-American settlement patterns in the region.

== Preservation ==
As of the 21st century, the Mag Blue House remains a well-preserved example of early 19th-century Federal-style architecture in North Carolina. Preservation efforts have focused on maintaining its original floor plan, porch structure, and exterior sheathing. Occasional public tours and heritage site visits have been coordinated by local preservation groups and historical societies.

== See also ==
- National Register of Historic Places listings in Scotland County, North Carolina
