= WLNC =

- Laurinburg, North Carolina; United States
- Frequency: 1300 kHz
- Branding: WLNC 95.1 FM 1300 AM

Programming
- Format: Adult contemporary, Oldies, and Carolina Beach Music

Ownership
- Owner: Scotland Broadcasting Company, Inc.

Technical information
- Licensing authority: FCC
- Facility ID: 22191
- Class: D
- Power: 500 watts day 74 watts night
- Transmitter coordinates: 34°47′0″N 79°26′22″W
- Translator: 95.1 W236BP (Laurinburg)

Links
- Public license information: Public file; LMS
- Webcast: Listen Live
- Website: wlncradio.com

WLNC (1300 AM) is a radio station broadcasting adult contemporary, oldies, and Carolina Beach Music. Licensed to Laurinburg, North Carolina, United States, the station is currently owned by Scotland Broadcasting Company, Inc.

In 1994, WLNC was one of 79 stations approved for the AM expanded band. The station signed on each morning at 6 A.M. with 500 watts and signed off at 7:30 P.M. to protect WJFK. The daytime signal for the adult contemporary and local news station was 1,000 watts, from 6:30 A.M. to 6:30 P.M. The station would have moved to 1620 AM and added a nighttime signal, allowing election results and sports events.

The station's daytime power is 500 watts (non-directional). While the station is authorized to broadcast at night with a power of 74 watts (non-directional), it currently does not operate at night.
