= Scotland County Highland Games (North Carolina) =

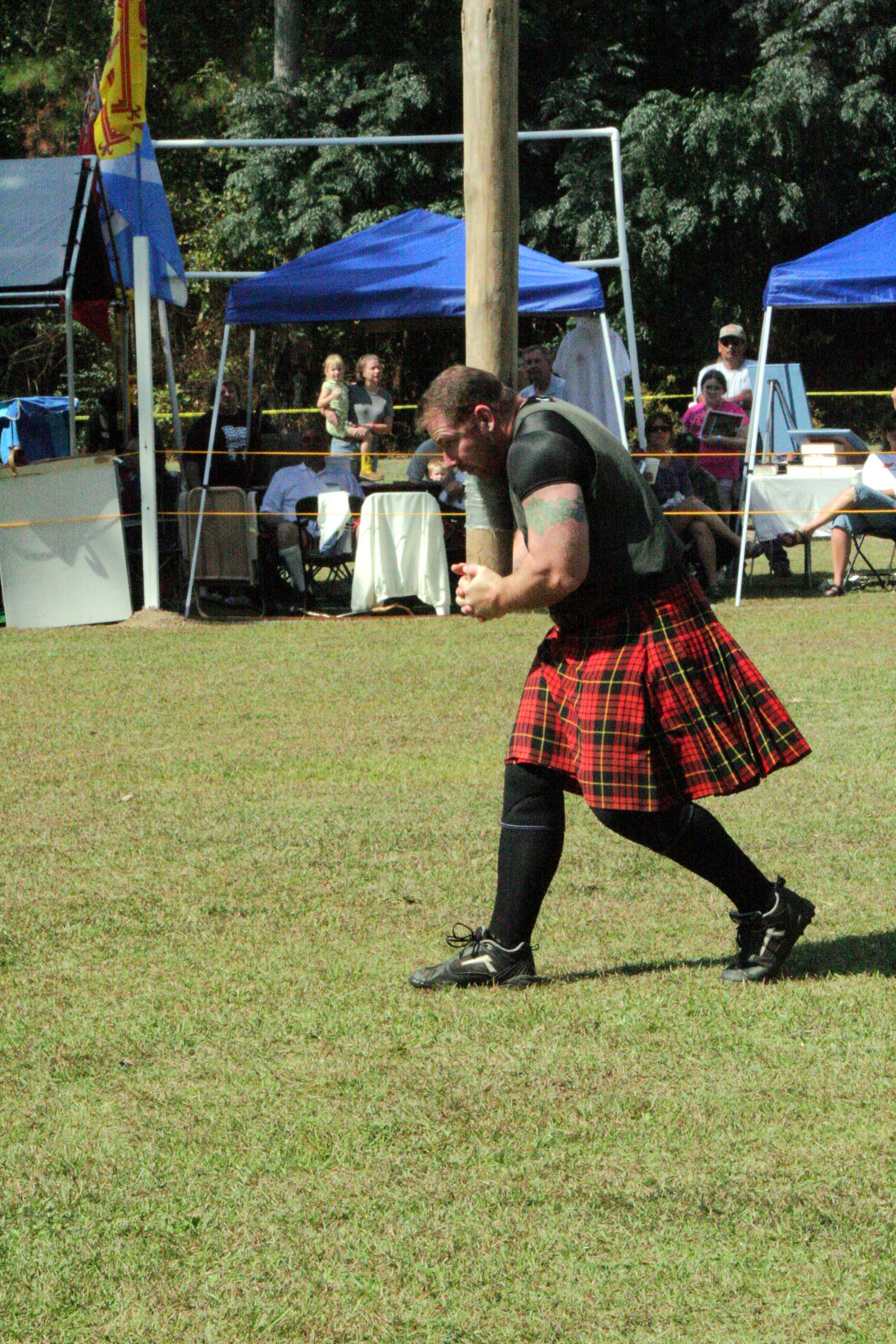

The Scotland County Highland Games, or SCHG, are a Scottish event held in Laurinburg, North Carolina, United States. Each year, the games are held the first weekend of October at the John Blue House and Grounds in Laurinburg. The event was started in 2009 after the Flora MacDonald Games in Red Springs, North Carolina were discontinued.

The event fits the area, as Scotland County was settled by Highlander Scots and continues to have one of the largest concentrations of Highland Scots in North America. The games serve as a premier celebration of Scottish and Celtic cultures in the Upper Cape Fear and Pee Dee regions.

There were no games held in 2020-21, due to the COVID-19 pandemic.

== Events ==
=== Parade of tartans ===
The day begins with an opening ceremony and then the parade of tartans, which is both a ceremony and honor and includes every clan attending the games. Each clan sends representatives to parade around the field to "announce" their presence and support. Several pipe bands also take part. The games typically attract more than 40 different clans each year.

=== Athletics ===
The games include a wide range of athletic events, a number of which are traditional and uniquely Scottish. Events include the caber toss, Scottish hammer throw (the hammer is actually a heavy metal "stone" attached to a shaft), and the sheaf toss (throwing a 20-pound bag of straw straight up using a pitchfork).

=== Children's games and other events ===
The SCHG also provide competition for children in attendance. Scaled-down versions of events are set up by age groups.

=== Sheepdog exhibition ===
In addition to the athletic competition, a fan favorite is the exhibition of sheep herding with border collies on the playing field. The crowds is captivated by the skill of the collies as they respond to their master and herd the sheep across the field into a defined area.

=== Piping and drumming ===
The Scotland County Highland Games hold a full spectrum of EUSPBA-sanctioned pipe band and individual piping and drumming competitions. Band competition includes grade III, IV and V bands.

=== Music ===
On-stage music is also part of the festivities. Music ranges from traditional Gaelic and Celtic bands to more progressive bands that merge rock and Celtic sound.

=== Vendors ===
Numerous vendors sell everything from kilts and other clothing to swords and daggers. Vendors from throughout the Southeast are on hand to sell Scottish-themed merchandise.

== See also ==
- Grandfather Mountain Highland Games, at the meeting point of Avery, Caldwell, and Watauga counties
