= Central School (Laurinburg, North Carolina) =

Historic school building in North Carolina, United States

- U.S. National Register of Historic Places
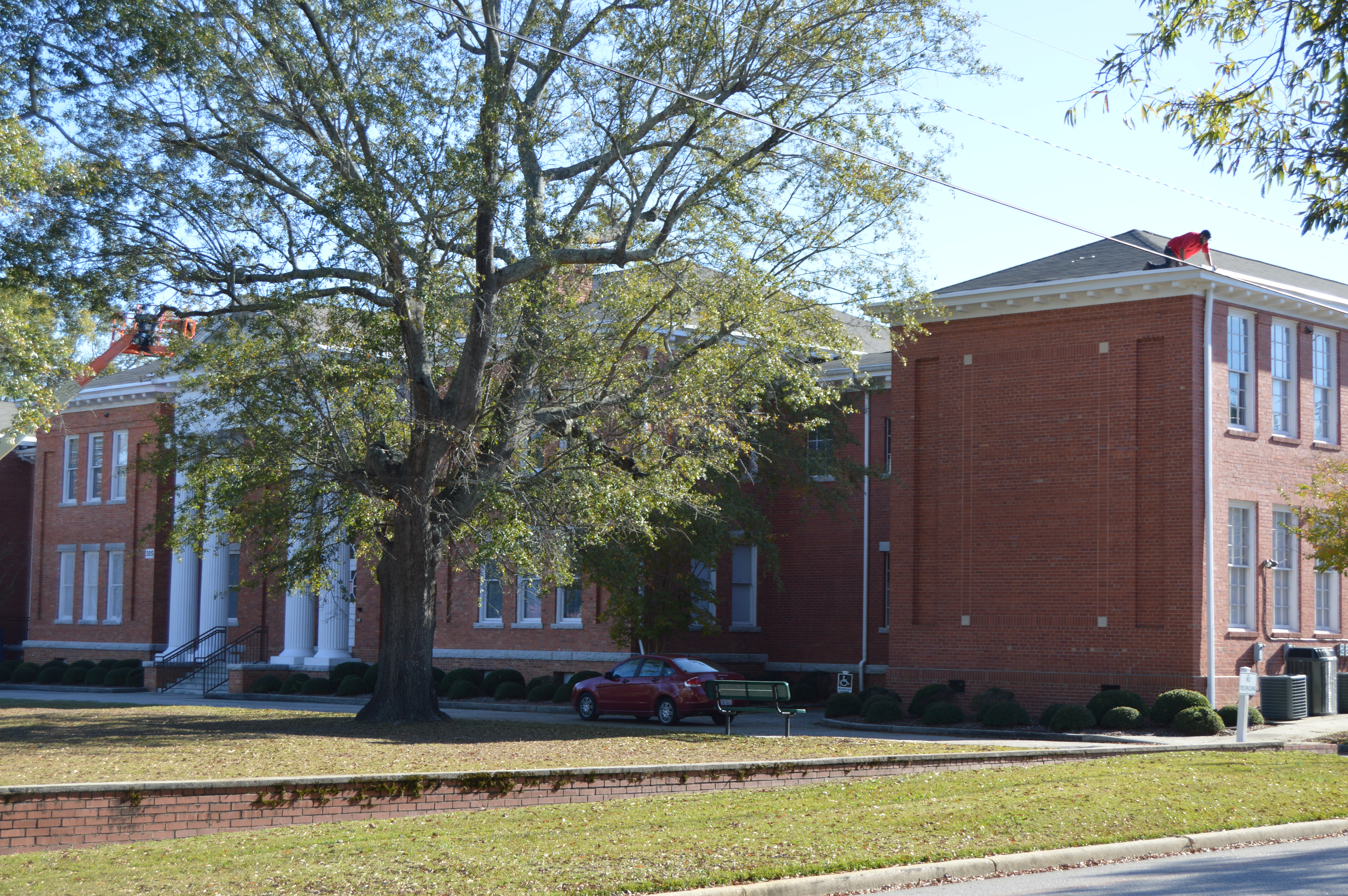
- Front of the school, with a flanking wing at right

- Location within North Carolina Location within the United States
- Location: 303 McRae St., Laurinburg, North Carolina
- Coordinates: 34°46′13″N 79°27′40″W
- Area: 3.1 acres (1.3 ha)
- Built: 1910
- Built by: W.E. Matthews
- Architect: Oliver Duke Wheeler, Leslie Boney
- Architectural style: Neoclassical
- NRHP reference No.: 04001525
- Added to NRHP: January 20, 2005

The Central School, also known as Laurinburg Graded School, is a historic school building located at Laurinburg, Scotland County, North Carolina. The original section was designed by architect Oliver Duke Wheeler and built in 1909–1910. It is a two-story, brick building in Neoclassical style. The main entrance features a prominent central portico with four Doric order columns. Two-story flanking wings were added in 1939, and additions to the wings were made in 1948 and 1949 and designed by Leslie Boney. The school closed in 2000.

It was listed on the National Register of Historic Places in 2005.
