= Laurinburg, North Carolina =

- City
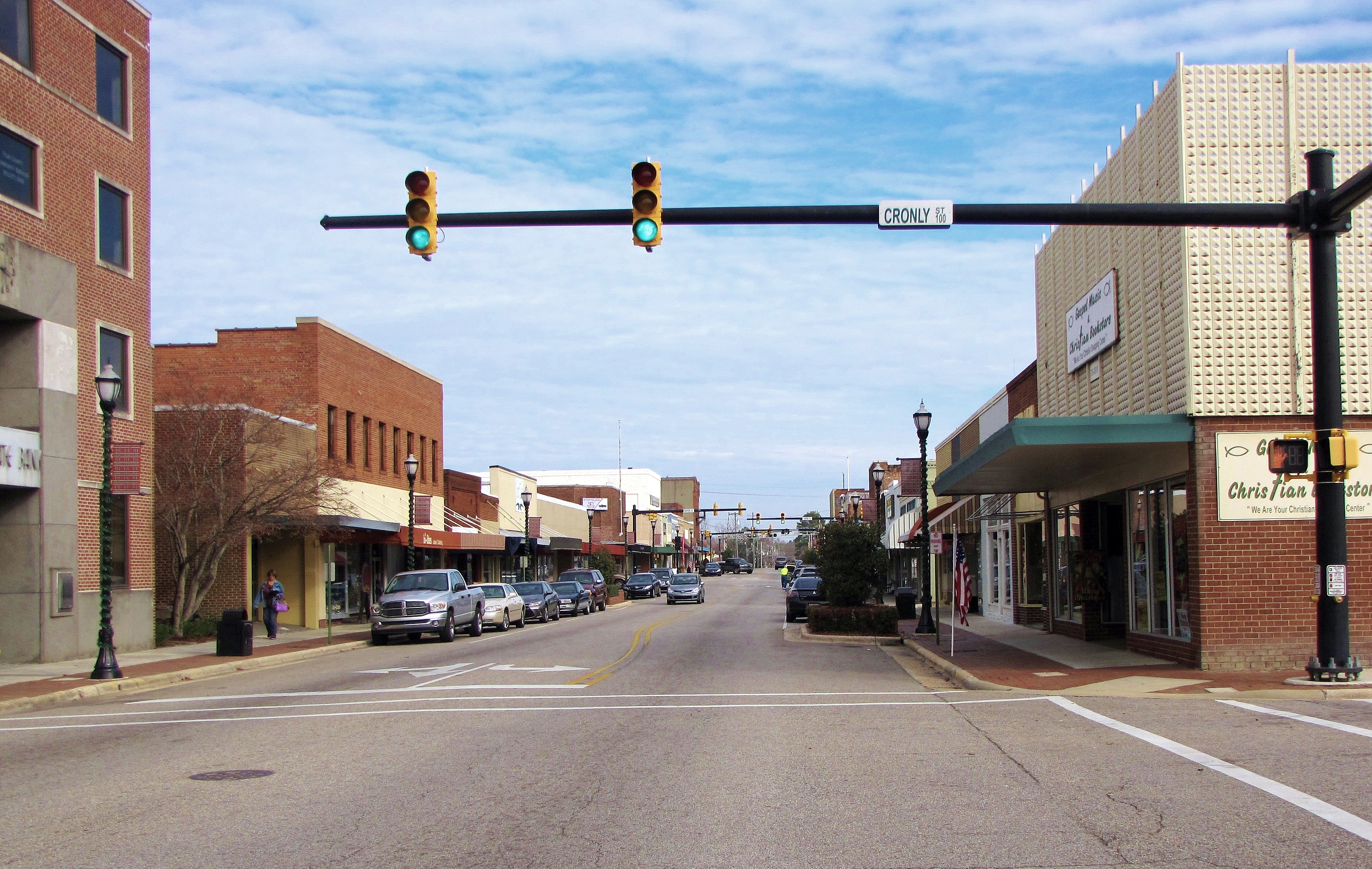
- Main Street in Laurinburg

- Seal
- Nicknames: LBG, The Burg
- Location in Scotland County and the state of North Carolina.
- Coordinates: 34°45′37″N 79°28′38″W
- Country: United States
- State: North Carolina
- County: Scotland
- Incorporated: 1877

Government
  - Mayor: James "Jim" Willis

Area
  - Total: 12.71 sq mi (32.91 km^{2})
  - Land: 12.55 sq mi (32.50 km^{2})
  - Water: 0.16 sq mi (0.41 km^{2})
- Elevation: 217 ft (66 m)

Population (2020)
  - Total: 14,978
  - Density: 1,193.8/sq mi (460.91/km^{2})
- Time zone: UTC−5 (Eastern (EST))
  - Summer (DST): UTC−4 (EDT)
- ZIP codes: 28352-28353
- Area codes: 910, 472
- FIPS code: 37-37220
- GNIS feature ID: 2404892
- Website: www.laurinburg.org

Laurinburg is a city in and the county seat of Scotland County, North Carolina, United States. Located in south central North Carolina near the South Carolina border, Laurinburg is southwest of Fayetteville and was home to St. Andrews University. The population was 14,978 at the 2020 Census.

== History ==
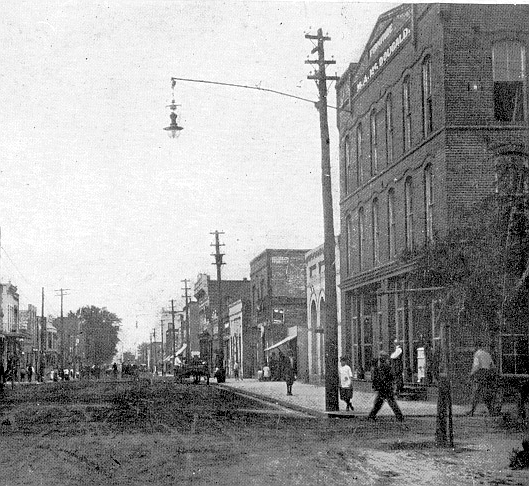
Main Street, c. 1910

Settlers arrived at the present town site around 1785. The settlement was named for a prominent family, the McLaurins. The name was originally spelled Laurinburgh and pronounced as if it were spelled "Laurinboro", similar to the pronunciation of Edinburgh in Scotland, though the "h" was later dropped. The community was initially located within the jurisdiction of Richmond County. In 1840, Laurinburg had a saloon, a store, and a few shacks. Laurinburg High School, a private school, was established in 1852. The settlement prospered in the years following. A line of the Wilmington, Charlotte and Rutherford Railroad was built through Laurinburg in the 1850s, with the first train reaching Laurinburg in 1861. The railroad's shops were moved to Laurinburg in 1865 in the hope they would be safer from Union Army attack; however, in March of that year, Union forces reached Laurinburg and burned the railroad depot and temporary shops. The shops were later rebuilt. Laurinburg was incorporated in 1877. In 1894 the railway shops were moved out of the town and, combined with low cotton prices, property values in the area decreased and the town experienced an economic depression.

By the late 1800s Richmond County had a majority black population and tended to support the Republican Party in elections, while the state of North Carolina was dominated by the Democratic Party. As a result of this, white Democrats built up a political base in Laurinburg, including a series of riots by the paramilitary Red Shirts between May and November, 1898, repeated in other areas of Richmond County and the North Carolinian Black Belt, aimed at intimidating black and white fusionists. Wilmington's The Morning Star reported that, by Election Day on November 8th, over five hundred black voters had removed their names from Richmond County voting rolls, the majority in Laurinburg. With the resulting sweeping victories of Democratic candidates, in 1899, the town and the surrounding area was split off from Richmond into the new Scotland County. The town was declared the seat of Scotland County in 1900 and the first courthouse was erected the following year. As their influence in public affairs and share of public resources declined, local black citizens created the Laurinburg Normal Industrial Institute, later known as Laurinburg Academy, in 1904.

Main Street in Laurinburg was paved in 1914. Beginning in 1929, the Great Depression severely impacted Laurinburg, causing two banks to fail. A new courthouse was built in 1964. Laurinburg's downtown suffered an economic decline beginning in the 1980s when the Belk department store moved to a shopping center further away. The downtown was heavily impacted by Hurricane Florence in 2018.

=== Historic sites ===
Several sites in Laurinburg are listed on the National Register of Historic Places listings in Scotland County, North Carolina, including:

- John Blue House
- Mag Blue House
- Central School
- Dr. Evan Alexander Erwin House
- E. Hervey Evans House
- Thomas J. Gill House
- Laurel Hill Presbyterian Church
- Laurinburg Commercial Historic District
- St. Andrews University
- Stewart-Hawley-Malloy House
- Laurinburg Institute
- Villa Nova

== Geography ==
According to the United States Census Bureau, the city has a total area of 12.71 square miles (32.9 km^{2}), of which 12.55 square miles (32.5 km^{2}) is land and 0.16 square miles (0.41 km^{2}) (1.26%) is water.

Laurinburg is located 19 miles (31 km) northeast of Bennettsville, 26 miles (42 km) east of Rockingham, 32 miles (51 km) west of Lumberton, and 41 miles (66 km) southwest of Fayetteville.

== Climate ==
Climate data for Laurinburg, North Carolina, (1991–2020 normals, extremes 1946–present)
Month	Jan	Feb	Mar	Apr	May	Jun	Jul	Aug	Sep	Oct	Nov	Dec	Year
Record high °F (°C)	82 (28)	84 (29)	91 (33)	96 (36)	100 (38)	106 (41)	107 (42)	107 (42)	103 (39)	101 (38)	88 (31)	81 (27)	107 (42)
Mean maximum °F (°C)	73.3 (22.9)	76.7 (24.8)	83.1 (28.4)	88.9 (31.6)	93.6 (34.2)	98.3 (36.8)	99.3 (37.4)	98.0 (36.7)	93.4 (34.1)	87.6 (30.9)	80.1 (26.7)	74.1 (23.4)	100.8 (38.2)
Mean daily maximum °F (°C)	55.0 (12.8)	59.4 (15.2)	67.1 (19.5)	76.7 (24.8)	83.8 (28.8)	89.9 (32.2)	93.0 (33.9)	90.7 (32.6)	85.5 (29.7)	76.4 (24.7)	66.0 (18.9)	58.2 (14.6)	75.2 (24.0)
Daily mean °F (°C)	44.1 (6.7)	47.5 (8.6)	54.6 (12.6)	63.4 (17.4)	72.0 (22.2)	79.1 (26.2)	82.4 (28.0)	80.5 (26.9)	75.0 (23.9)	64.3 (17.9)	53.9 (12.2)	47.1 (8.4)	63.7 (17.6)
Mean daily minimum °F (°C)	33.2 (0.7)	35.6 (2.0)	42.0 (5.6)	50.1 (10.1)	60.2 (15.7)	68.2 (20.1)	71.8 (22.1)	70.3 (21.3)	64.5 (18.1)	52.2 (11.2)	41.8 (5.4)	36.0 (2.2)	52.2 (11.2)
Mean minimum °F (°C)	17.1 (−8.3)	21.6 (−5.8)	26.1 (−3.3)	34.1 (1.2)	46.1 (7.8)	57.6 (14.2)	63.9 (17.7)	62.0 (16.7)	52.0 (11.1)	36.6 (2.6)	26.5 (−3.1)	21.9 (−5.6)	15.2 (−9.3)
Record low °F (°C)	−3 (−19)	6 (−14)	8 (−13)	24 (−4)	34 (1)	45 (7)	53 (12)	48 (9)	39 (4)	21 (−6)	14 (−10)	5 (−15)	−3 (−19)
Average precipitation inches (mm)	3.55 (90)	3.26 (83)	3.42 (87)	2.95 (75)	3.50 (89)	5.01 (127)	4.33 (110)	5.08 (129)	5.48 (139)	3.19 (81)	3.24 (82)	3.55 (90)	46.56 (1,183)
Average snowfall inches (cm)	0.5 (1.3)	0.4 (1.0)	0.0 (0.0)	0.0 (0.0)	0.0 (0.0)	0.0 (0.0)	0.0 (0.0)	0.0 (0.0)	0.0 (0.0)	0.0 (0.0)	0.0 (0.0)	0.2 (0.51)	1.1 (2.8)
Average precipitation days (≥ 0.01 in)	11.3	9.9	10.2	8.9	9.0	11.2	11.8	11.7	9.2	7.9	8.6	11.7	121.4
Average snowy days (≥ 0.1 in)	0.3	0.2	0.0	0.0	0.0	0.0	0.0	0.0	0.0	0.0	0.0	0.0	0.5
Source: NOAA

== Demographics ==
Historical population
Census	Pop.	Note	%±
1880	968		—
1890	1,357		40.2%
1900	1,334		−1.7%
1910	2,322		74.1%
1920	2,643		13.8%
1930	3,312		25.3%
1940	5,685		71.6%
1950	7,134		25.5%
1960	8,242		15.5%
1970	8,859		7.5%
1980	11,480		29.6%
1990	11,643		1.4%
2000	15,874		36.3%
2010	15,962		0.6%
2020	14,978		−6.2%
U.S. Decennial Census

=== 2020 census ===
As of the 2020 census, Laurinburg had a population of 14,978. The median age was 40.3 years. 24.3% of residents were under the age of 18 and 21.3% of residents were 65 years of age or older. For every 100 females there were 84.5 males, and for every 100 females age 18 and over there were 77.5 males age 18 and over.

99.5% of residents lived in urban areas, while 0.5% lived in rural areas.

There were 6,098 households in Laurinburg, of which 30.9% had children under the age of 18 living in them. Of all households, 30.2% were married-couple households, 18.1% were households with a male householder and no spouse or partner present, and 46.6% were households with a female householder and no spouse or partner present. About 34.5% of all households were made up of individuals and 17.7% had someone living alone who was 65 years of age or older. There were 3,544 families residing in the city.

There were 6,805 housing units, of which 10.4% were vacant. The homeowner vacancy rate was 2.4% and the rental vacancy rate was 8.0%.

Laurinburg Racial Composition
Race	Num.	Perc.
White	5,552	37.07%
Black or African American	7,115	47.5%
Native American	1,012	6.76%
Asian	189	1.26%
Pacific Islander	6	0.04%
Other/Mixed	688	4.59%
Hispanic or Latino	416	2.78%

The black population is concentrated in the northern section of the city.

=== 2000 census ===
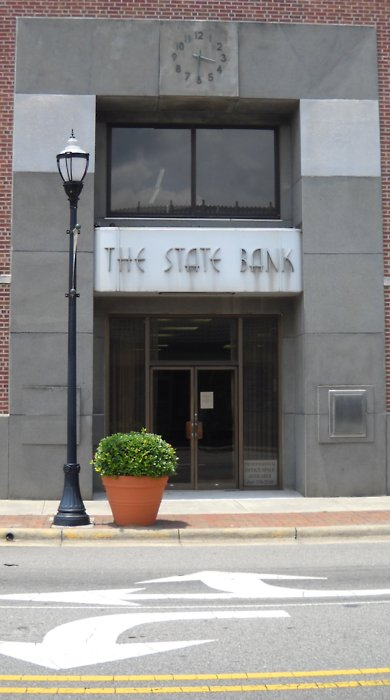
The State Bank building in downtown Laurinburg

As of the census of 2000, there were 15,874 people, 6,136 households, and 4,221 families residing in the city. The population density was 1,280.2 inhabitants per square mile (494.3/km^{2}). There were 6,603 housing units at an average density of 532.5 per square mile (205.6/km^{2}). The racial makeup of the city was 50.54% White, 43.06% African American, 4.23% Native American, 0.76% Asian, 0.03% Pacific Islander, 0.35% from other races, and 1.04% from two or more races. Hispanic or Latino of any race were 1.06% of the population.

There were 6,136 households, out of which 32.1% had children under the age of 18 living with them, 41.8% were married couples living together, 23.2% had a female householder with no husband present, and 31.2% were non-families. 27.9% of all households were made up of individuals, and 11.0% had someone living alone who was 65 years of age or older. The average household size was 2.46 and the average family size was 3.00.

In the city, the population was spread out, with 26.6% under the age of 18, 10.7% from 18 to 24, 25.9% from 25 to 44, 22.7% from 45 to 64, and 14.1% who were 65 years of age or older. The median age was 36 years. For every 100 females, there were 81.2 males. For every 100 females age 18 and over, there were 74.7 males.

The median income for a household in the city was $29,064, and the median income for a family was $37,485. Males had a median income of $31,973 versus $25,243 for females. The per capita income for the city was $16,165. About 19.7% of families and 23.6% of the population were below the poverty line, including 35.5% of those under age 18 and 18.6% of those age 65 or over.

The state Scotland Correctional Institution, located near the airport, opened in 2003.

== Education ==
=== High school ===
- Scotland High School

=== College ===
The city was home to St. Andrews University, formerly known as St. Andrews Presbyterian College.

== Media ==
Laurinburg is served by the local newspaper, The Laurinburg Exchange.

The local radio station is WLNC.

== Notable people ==
- Russ Adams, former MLB infielder for the Toronto Blue Jays
- Megan Brigman, former professional women's soccer player
- Brent Butler, former MLB infielder
- Bucky Covington, country musician and American Idol Season 5 finalist
- Wes Covington, former MLB outfielder
- Robert Dozier, professional basketball player
- Lorinza Harrington, former NBA player
- Joseph Roswell Hawley, four-term U.S. Senator, two-term U.S. Congressman, Governor of Connecticut, and Union Army Major General
- Harriet McBryde Johnson, activist for the disabled
- Sam Jones, former NBA Shooting Guard, 10x NBA Champion, 5x NBA All-Star, 3x All-NBA Second Team, NBA Anniversary Team Boston Celtics#24 retired
- Samantha Joye, oceanographer known for her work studying the Deepwater Horizon Oil Spill
- Terrell Manning, NFL player
- William S. McArthur, former United States Army colonel and NASA astronaut
- Bejun Mehta, countertenor
- James Dickson Phillips Jr., United States Court of Appeals judge
- William R. Purcell, physician and politician
- Travian Robertson, NFL defensive end
- Kelvin Sampson, college basketball coach
- Terry Sanford, former Governor of North Carolina and U.S. Senator
- Charlie Scott, NBA All-Star and University of North Carolina at Chapel Hill player, Olympic gold medalist in 1968, and valedictorian at Laurinburg Institute
- Woody Shaw, hard-bop (jazz) trumpeter
- Franklin Stubbs, MLB player
- Hilee Taylor, NFL defensive end
- Leonard Thompson, PGA Tour golfer
- Ben Vereen, actor, dancer, and singer
- Jacoby Watkins, former NFL cornerback and North Carolina football player
- Zamir White, NFL Running Back, Las Vegas Raiders
- Christopher Witmore academic archaeologist and author

== Sister cities ==
Laurinburg has one sister city, as designated by Sister Cities International:

- Oban, Argyll and Bute, Scotland

== See also ==
- List of municipalities in North Carolina

== Bibliography ==
- Covington, Howard E. Jr; Ellis, Marion A. (1999). Terry Sanford: Politics, Progress, and Outrageous Ambitions. Durham: Duke University Press. ISBN 978-0-8223-2356-3.
