= Stewart-Hawley-Malloy House =

Historic house in North Carolina, United States

- U.S. National Register of Historic Places
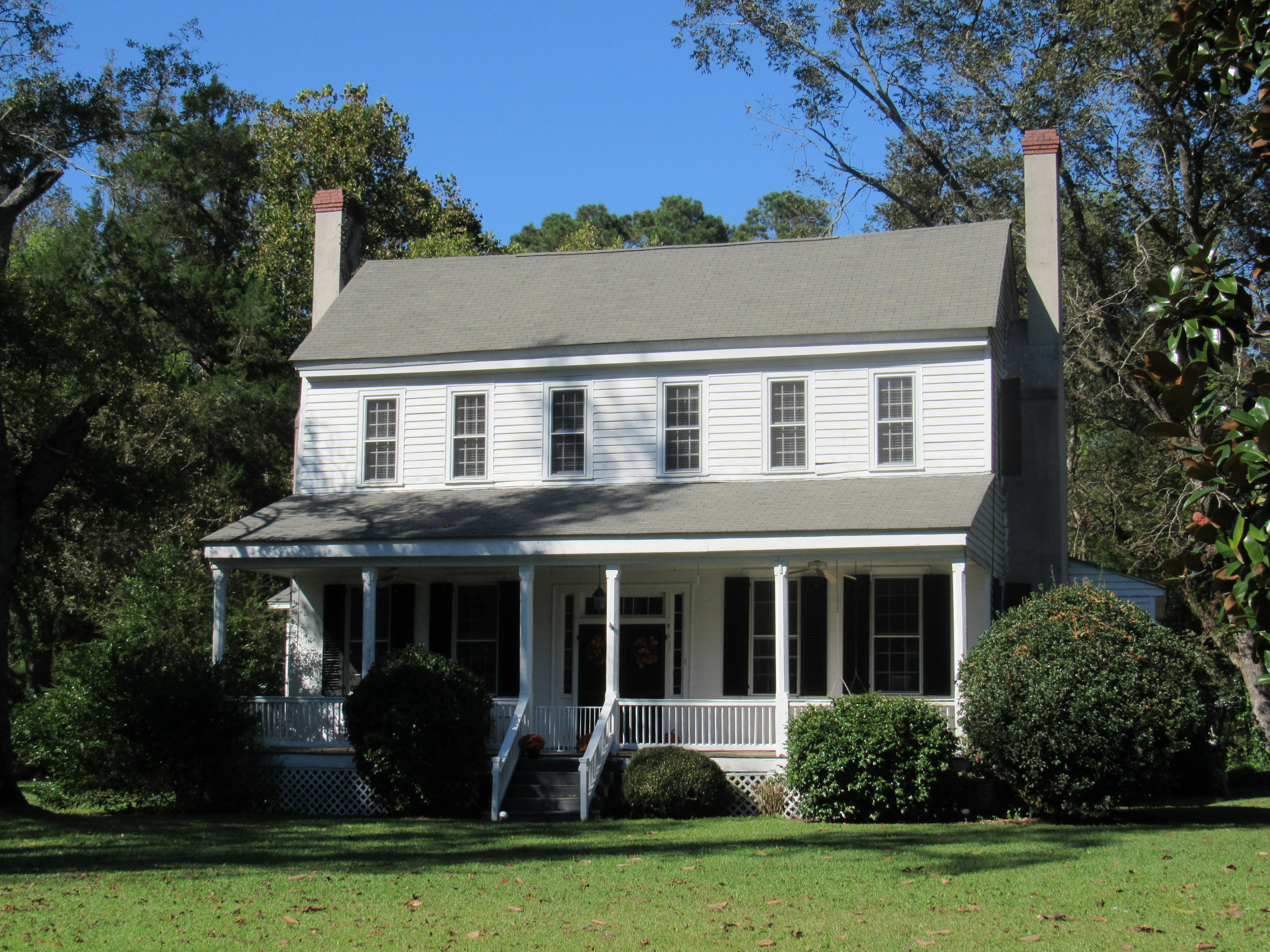

- Location within North Carolina Location within the United States
- Location: SE of Laurinburg at jct. of SR 1610 and 1609, near Laurinburg, North Carolina
- Coordinates: 34°44′35″N 79°25′1″W
- Area: 5 acres (2.0 ha)
- Built: c. 1800
- Architectural style: Georgian, Federal
- NRHP reference No.: 75001291
- Added to NRHP: August 1, 1975

Stewart-Hawley-Malloy House is a historic home located near Laurinburg, Scotland County, North Carolina. It was built about 1800, and is a transitional Georgian / Federal style frame dwelling. It consists of a two-story, five bay by two bay, main block with a one-story, two bay by four bay, wing. The main block has a full-width, one-story front porch and rear shed additions. It was built by North Carolina politician James Stewart (1775–1821) and the birthplace of Connecticut politician Joseph Roswell Hawley (1826–1905).

It was added to the National Register of Historic Places in 1975.
