= Cal Shaw Adobe Duplex =

Historic house in Nevada, United States

- U.S. National Register of Historic Places
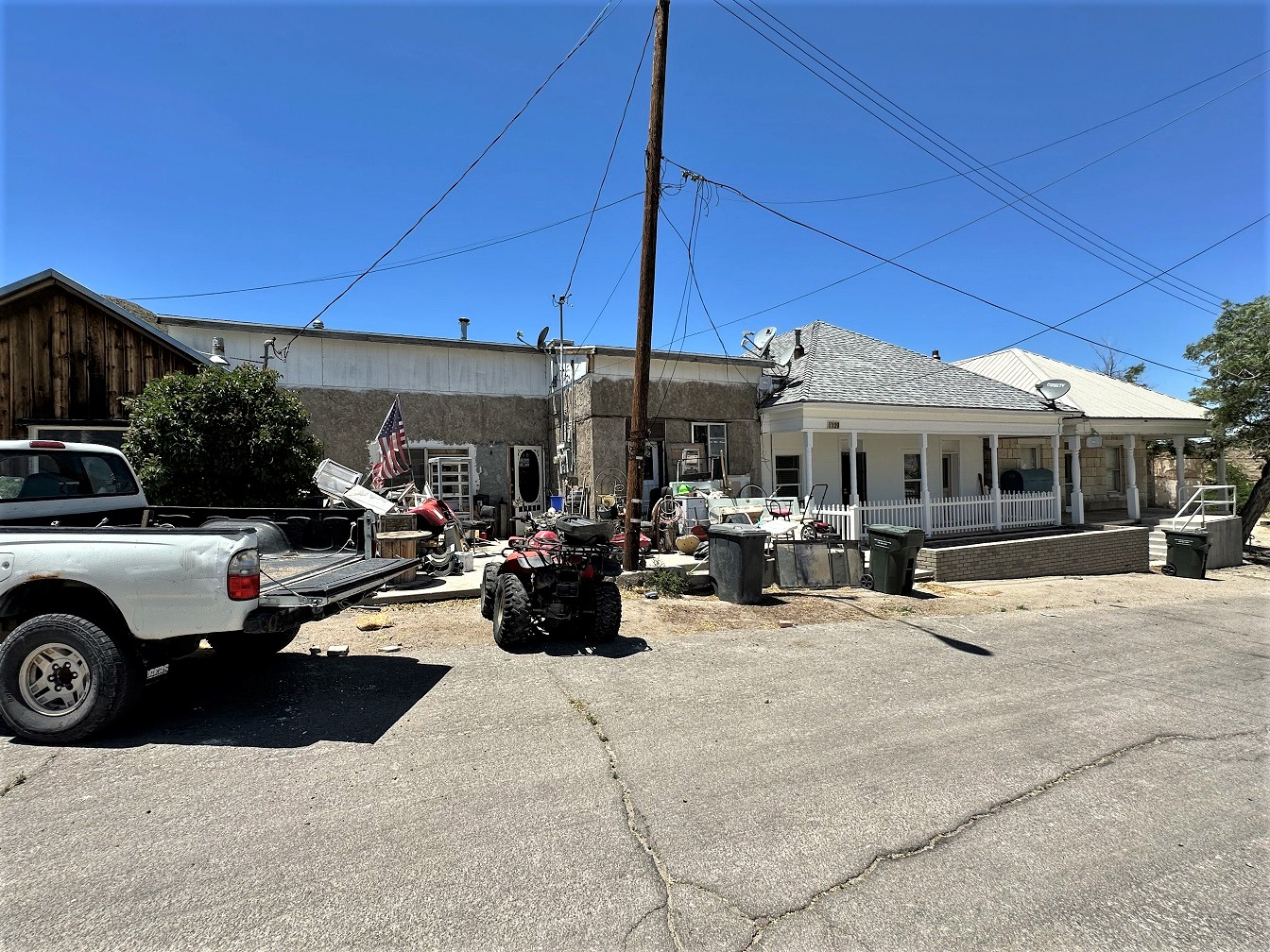

- Location within Nevada Location within the United States
- Location: 129 Central; Tonopah, Nevada
- Coordinates: 38.06845°N 117.23247°W
- Area: less than one acre
- Built: 1905
- MPS: Tonopah MRA
- NRHP reference No.: 82003243
- Added to NRHP: May 20, 1982

The Cal Shaw Adobe Duplex is an adobe house located at 129 Central Street in Tonopah, Nevada. The house, which was built in 1905, is typical of the adobe homes commonly built in Tonopah in the early 1900s. The building's exterior is scored to resemble stone; the home's design also features a decorative frieze and a porch supported by turned columns. The home has changed little since its construction and has been called "the best preserved adobe residence in Tonopah" by a local historic survey.

The homes on Central Street formed one of Tonopah's first residential districts. Houses on the street were built using a variety of construction types and designs. For instance, the Cal Shaw Stone Row House, located next to the Adobe Duplex, is another historic house built with a different material and design.

The house was added to the National Register of Historic Places on May 20, 1982.
