= McRae-McQueen House =

Historic house in North Carolina, United States

- U.S. National Register of Historic Places
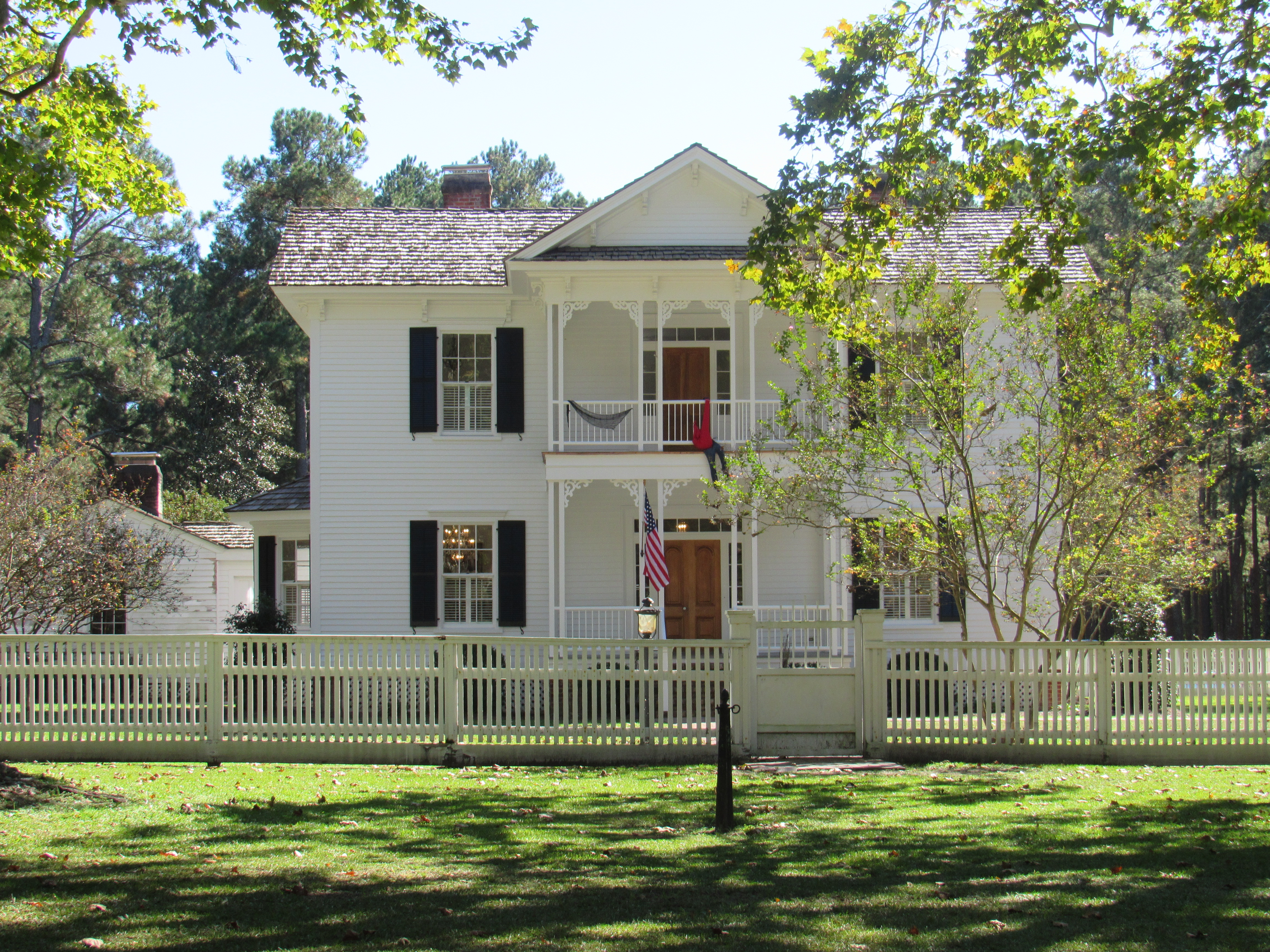

- Location within North Carolina Location within the United States
- Location: SW of Johns on US 501, near Johns, North Carolina
- Coordinates: 34°43′09″N 79°27′18″W
- Area: 10 acres (4.0 ha)
- Built: c. 1810, 1870s
- Architectural style: Italianate, Federal
- NRHP reference No.: 80004469
- Added to NRHP: November 25, 1980

McRae-McQueen House is a historic home located near Johns, Scotland County, North Carolina. The original section was built about 1810, and is a rectangular one-story frame structure. It was enlarged with a two-story, Federal style block in the 1870s. The later block has bracketed eaves and a two-tier portico.

It was added to the National Register of Historic Places in 1980.
