= Villa Nova (Laurinburg, North Carolina) =

Historic house in North Carolina, United States

- U.S. National Register of Historic Places
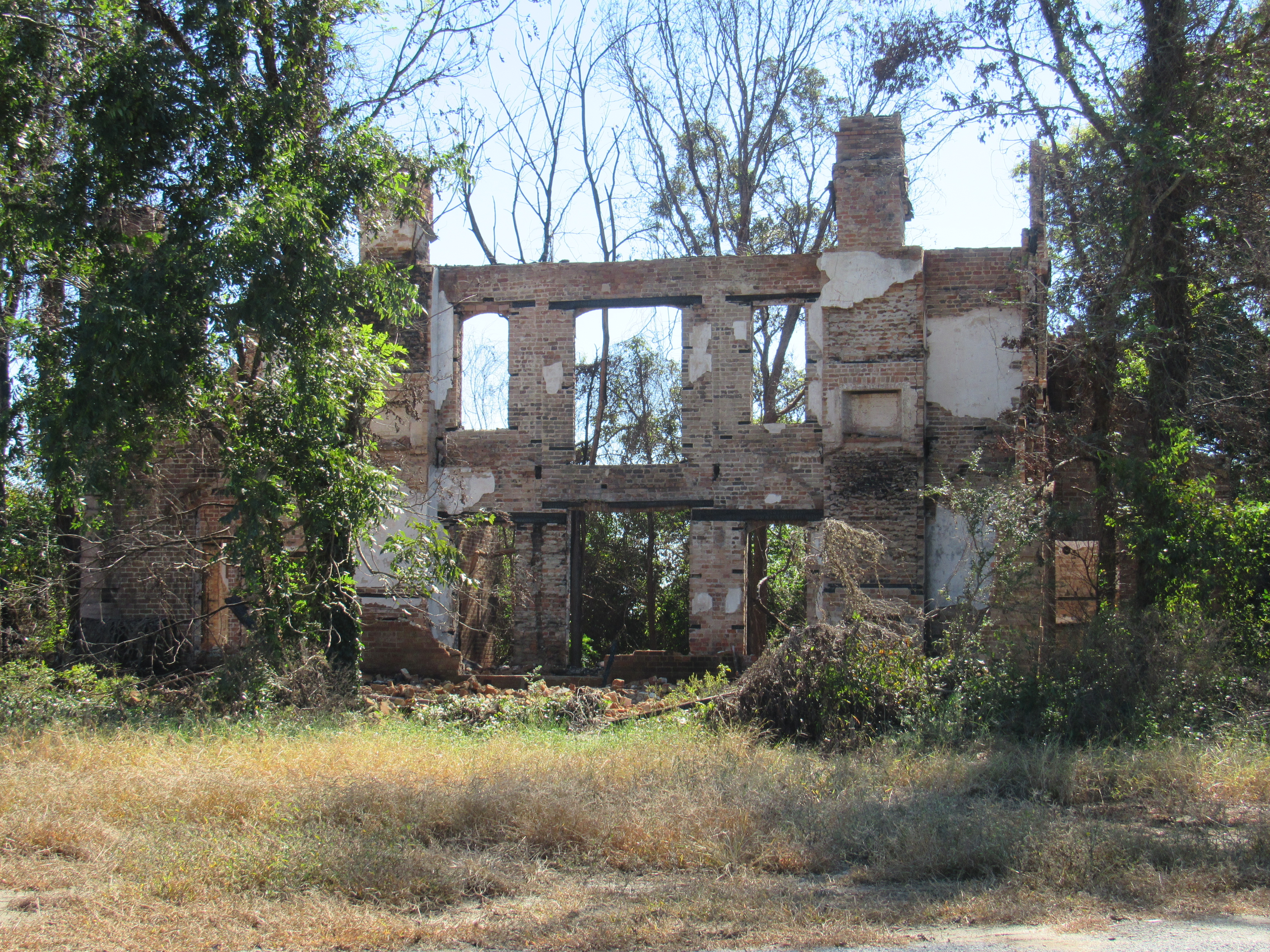
- Ruins of Villa Nova

- Location within North Carolina Location within the United States
- Location: SR 1438, Laurinburg, North Carolina
- Coordinates: 34°46′26″N 79°25′30″W
- Area: 2.5 acres (1.0 ha)
- Built: 1880
- Architectural style: Italianate
- NRHP reference No.: 82003514
- Added to NRHP: August 26, 1982

Villa Nova, also known as The Captain Stephen M. Thomas House, is a historic home located near Laurinburg, Scotland County, North Carolina. It was built in 1880, and is a two-story, three bay by one bay, Italianate-style brick dwelling, with one-story gabled roof ells. It has a free-standing one-story brick kitchen connected by a covered passage. It has a one-story front porch with a red and blue patterned grey slate roof.

It was added to the National Register of Historic Places in 1982.

On July 19th 2020, At around 7:20 P.M, Laurinburg 911 Received a Phone call Regarding the Villa Nova being fully engulfed in flames. By the time Firefighters arrived, "The structure was completely destroyed." said Laurinburg Fire Engineer Christopher Strickland. “It took about two hours from when we arrived to when we left the scene.” The cause of the fire is still undetermined.
