= Richmond Temperance and Literary Society Hall =

Historic building in North Carolina, US

- U.S. National Register of Historic Places
- Location within North Carolina Location within the United States
- Location: 1 miles SW of Wagram on SR 1405, near Wagram, North Carolina
- Coordinates: 34°53′04″N 79°23′17″W
- Area: 9.5 acres (3.8 ha)
- Built: 1860
- Architectural style: Octagon Mode
- NRHP reference No.: 73001368
- Added to NRHP: April 11, 1973

Richmond Temperance and Literary Society Hall is a historic building located near Wagram, Scotland County, North Carolina. It was built in 1860, and is a small, one-story, one room, hexagonal brick building. It was built for local temperance society meetings held through the end of the 19th century. It was used as a school until the 1920s. After 1959, it was restored for use as a museum.

It was added to the National Register of Historic Places in 1973.
