= Dr. Evan Alexander Erwin House =

Historic house in North Carolina, United States

- U.S. National Register of Historic Places
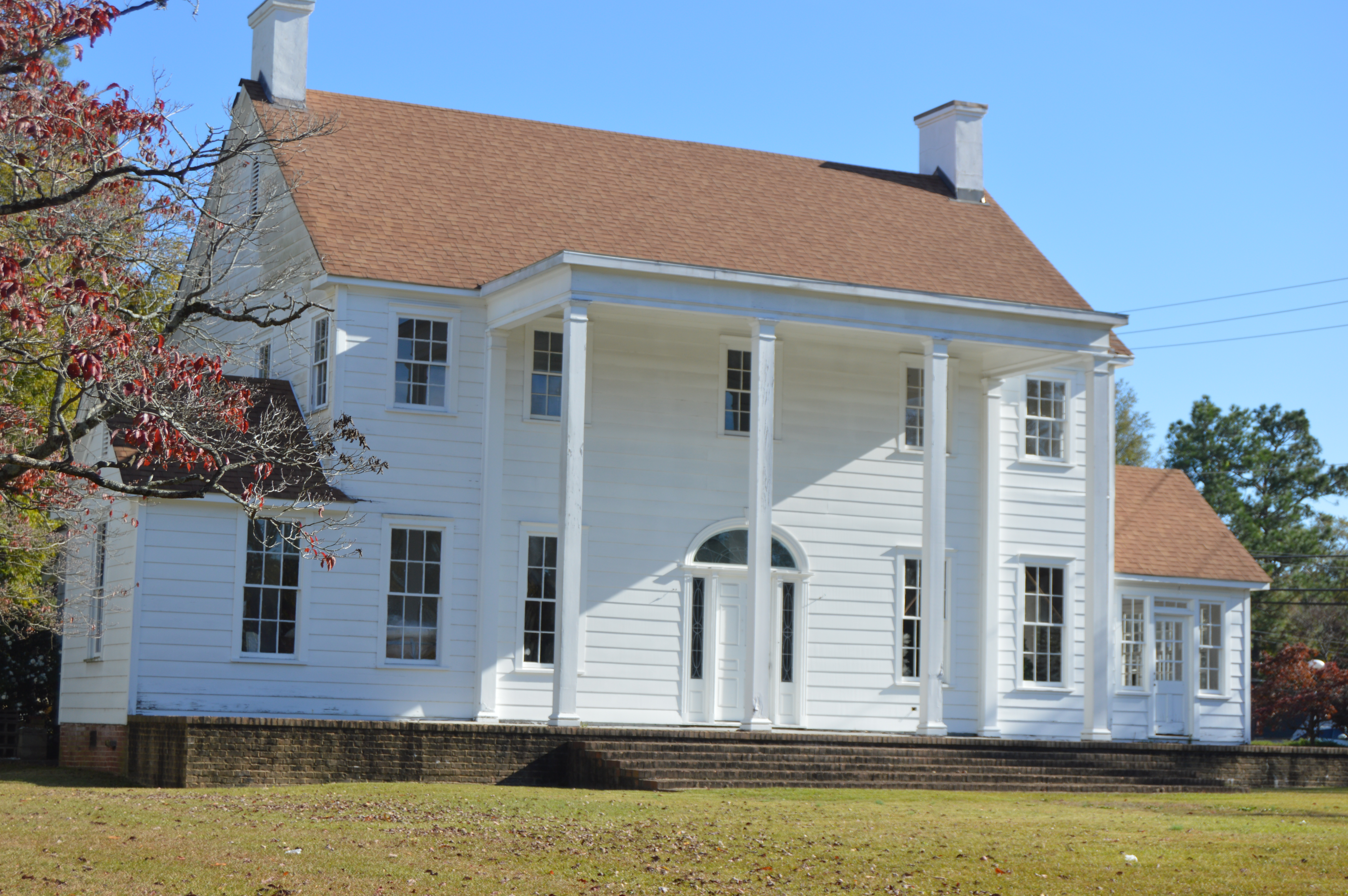
- Front, seen from the north

- Location within North Carolina Location within the United States
- Location: 520 S. Main St., Laurinburg, North Carolina
- Coordinates: 34°46′11″N 79°21′18″W
- Area: Less than 1 acre (0.40 ha)
- Built: 1939
- Architectural style: Classical Revival
- NRHP reference No.: 07000353
- Added to NRHP: April 19, 2007

Dr. Evan Alexander Erwin House is a historic home located at Laurinburg, Scotland County, North Carolina. It was built in 1904, and extensively remodeled in 1939 in the Classical Revival style. It is a two-story, five-bay, double pile, frame dwelling, with one-story side-gable flanking side wings. It features a two-story front porch with a flat roof and supported by four square slender wood columns with Tuscan order caps. Also on the property is a contributing two car garage.

It was added to the National Register of Historic Places in 2007.

Evan Alexander Erwin, one of 9 children, was born November 24,1884 in the Steele Creek Community, now a part of south Charlotte in Mecklenburg County, North Carolina. His parents were Margaret Evelyn Alexander born June 9, 1847 married F Francis Leander Erwin born September 9, 1833. Dr. Erwin attended college and earned a B. S. degree from the University of Georgia.He received his degree in medicine from the Medical College of South Carolina, Charleston in 1912. Before he opened his office in Laurinburg he spent months in New York in post-graduate study.

Dr. Erwin’s older sister, Martha Louise Erwin had married the Reverend John Howie Dixon, a Presbyterian minister, who served as pastor to Laurel Hill, Hill, Smyrna, and Aberdeen churches. Interestingly, Robert Rowe Covington provided a lot and home next door to Mr. Covington to the Reverend Dixon in 1907. Dr. Erwin visited his sister there and thereafter began a general practice in Laurinburg in 1912. Bessie Norment Covington, daughter of Robert Rowe Covington, lived next door to Dr. Erwin’ sister, and Dr. Erwin married Bessie Norment Covington (born December 4,1884) on January 10, 1917.

Miss Covington’s father, Robert Rowe Covington, was a large landowner and the father of 10 children, of whom 6 were girls, each of whom he loved dearly. The family story is that in order to keep his girls near, upon the occasion of their marriage, he built each of them a home on the same street as Mr. Covington and gave each of them a farm. It is unclear if Mr. Covington built the home for the Reverend Dixon, but it is the story in the family when the Dixons accepted a call to Charlotte, and upon marriage on January 10,1917, Dr. Erwin and Mr. Covington’s daughter, Bessie, moved into the home at 520 South Main Street, next door to her father.

Dr. Erwin served as county physician and Director of County Board of Health for a number of years . Dr . Erwin was a member of t he Laurinburg Presbyterian Church throughout his life in Laurinburg. His son, Dr. Evan Alexander Erwin, Jr., a physician also, volunteered to serve in the US Army Medical Corps in WWII after discussion with his father, Dr. Erwin. The senior Dr. Erwin suffered from cancer at the time. It is the story in the family that Dr. Erwin told his son to go and serve his country knowing full well that he would never again see his son. The senior Dr. Erwin died in September 20, 1944.

The younger Dr. Erwin practiced medicine in Laurinburg from 1946 until his retirement in 1972. This would be the home of the Erwin family and that of his son, Dr. Evan Alexander Erwin, Jr.,until the latter’s death in 1987. Subsequently, the wife of the younger Dr. Erwin, Maggie Sarah Jones Erwin, lived in the home until 2001.
