= E. Hervey Evans House =

Historic house in North Carolina, United States

- U.S. National Register of Historic Places
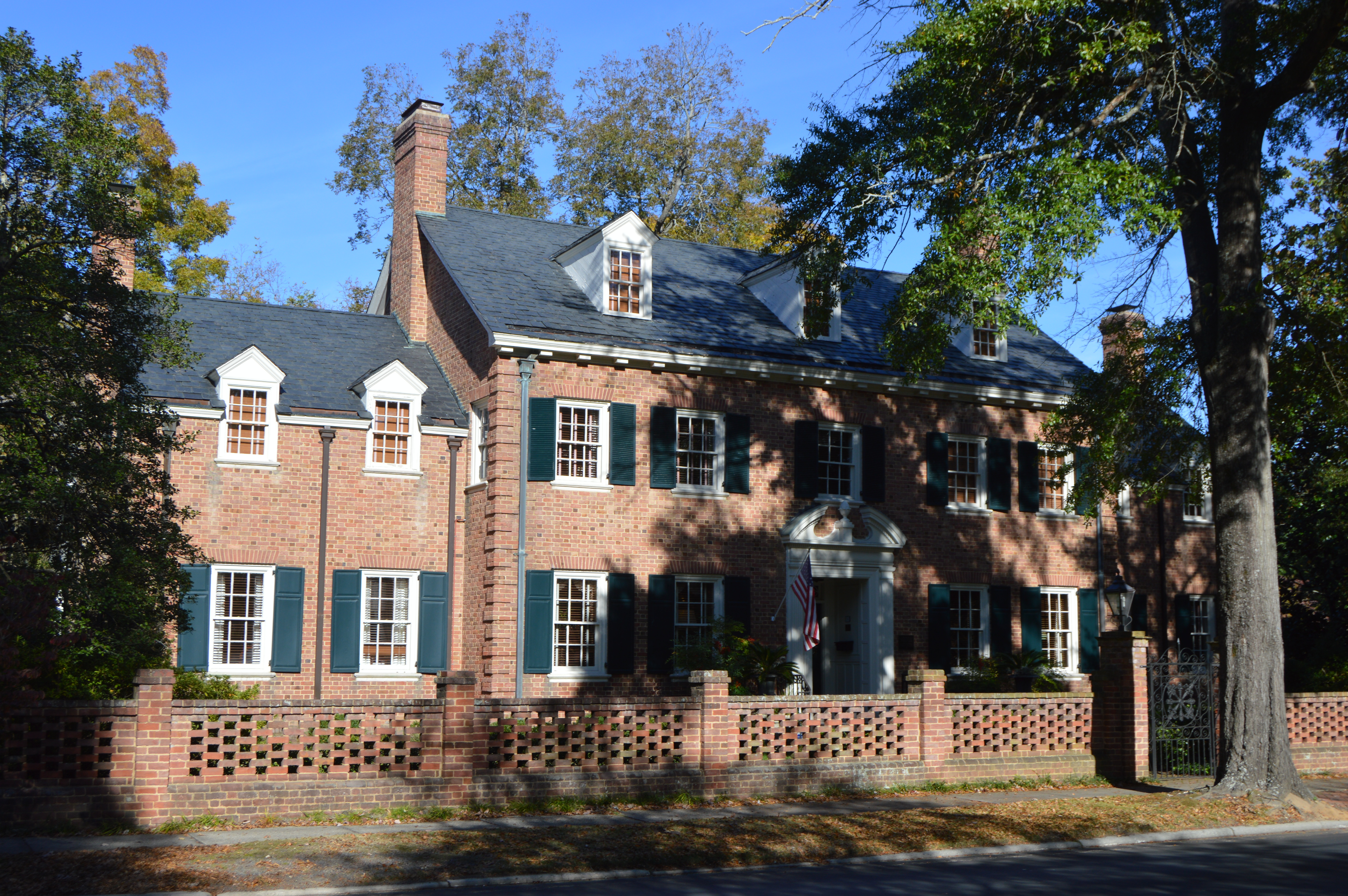
- Front of the house, seen from the west

- Location within North Carolina Location within the United States
- Location: 400 W. Church St., Laurinburg, North Carolina
- Coordinates: 34°46′31″N 79°28′0″W
- Area: Less than 1 acre (0.40 ha)
- Built: 1939
- Architect: John A. Weaver, Charles Gillette
- Architectural style: Colonial Revival
- NRHP reference No.: 06000224
- Added to NRHP: April 5, 2006

E. Hervey Evans House is a historic home located at Laurinburg, Scotland County, North Carolina. It was designed by architect John A. Weaver with initial plans presented to his clients on June 2, 1939. Weaver was employed in the Architectural Department of Macy's Department Store and listed his office as 1328 Broadway, NYC. Hervey Evans was an executive of various enterprises owned by his grandfather, John F. McNair. Evans was instrumental in selecting Weaver to design the Arts and Crafts style McNair's Department Store in 1938.

Hervey and his wife, Anne Borden Evans, were particularly inspired by the restoration occurring at Colonial Williamsburg by John D. Rockefeller Jr. During a tour along the James River, two homes greatly influenced their decision to build a Georgian Revival style brick dwelling: Westover (1729) and Carter's Grove (1750). Weaver incorporated elements of both plantations into the final design for the E. Hervey Evans House and Gardens.

Landscape architect Charles Gillette (1886–1969) of Richmond, Virginia, designed the extensive grounds. The peak years of Gillette's career coincided with the height of the Country Place era, when wealthy property owners throughout the United States built impressive country residences surrounded by meticulously conceived gardens. When the Architectural League of New York honored his work in 1938 for its “charm and adherence to the Southern tradition”, Gillette's reputation as the interpreter of southern gardens had already been firmly established in Virginia and the upper South. The Evans plan, dated August 1939, appears as Account 650 in Gillette's office Client Log. Gillette would also design two other landscapes in Laurinburg: Edwin Morgan (June 1948) and Z.V. Pate (December 1948).

Gillette planned extensive brick terraces, walkways, walls and formal plantings. Magnolia, dogwood, azalea, hydrangea and camellia provide color throughout the year while Tea Olive and Confederate Jasmine scent the air. An original Gillette designed fish pond is located in the Conservatory Courtyard. Two garden structures are based on earlier Gillette designs. The pool pavilion is based on the gazebo at the Woodrow Wilson Birthplace in Staunton, Virginia, and the pump house originated from the design for a never constructed tool shed at Elderslie in Richmond, Virginia.

The house consists of a 2 1/2-story, central five-bay block flanked by two recessed, symmetrical, two-bay, 1 1/2-story wings. Also on the property are the contributing three-car garage, smokehouse, pergola, greenhouse and croquet lawn .

The E. Hervey Evans House and Gardens was awarded the 2005 Minnette C. Duffy Landscape Preservation Award, North Carolina's highest award for the preservation, restoration and maintenance of gardens relating to historic structures.

The property was added to the National Register of Historic Places in 2006 and operated as the Thomas Walton Manor Bed & Breakfast from 2002 until 2016 when it again became a private residence .
