= Laurinburg Commercial Historic District =

Historic district in North Carolina, United States

- U.S. National Register of Historic Places
- U.S. Historic district
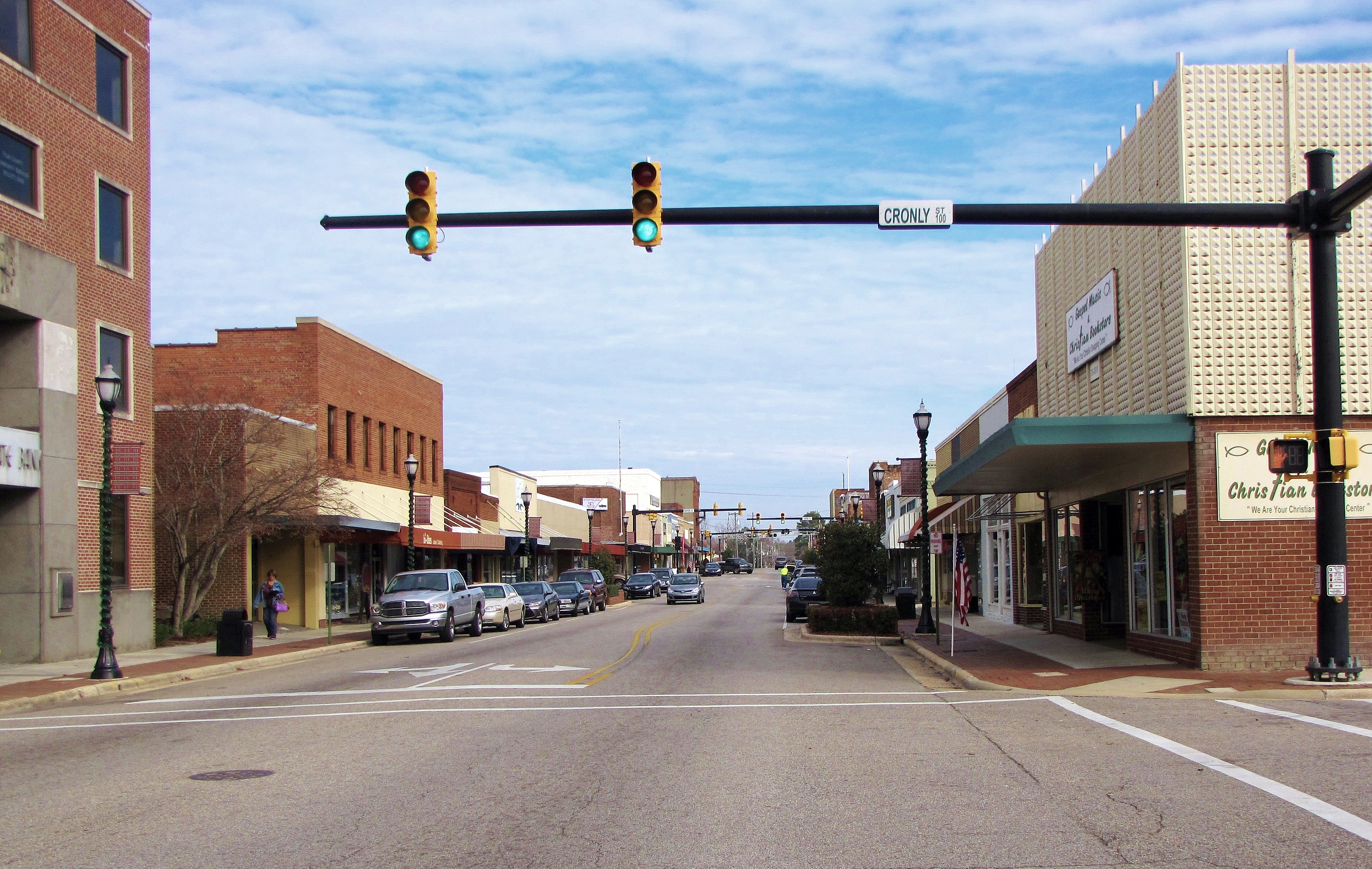
- Main Street, looking north from Cronly Street

- Location within North Carolina Location within the United States
- Location: Roughly bounded by Church, Atkinson, Biggs Sts. and the Laurinburg and Southern RR, Laurinburg, North Carolina
- Coordinates: 34°46′34″N 79°27′42″W
- Area: 20 acres (8.1 ha)
- Built: 1893
- Architect: Henry E. Bonitz; Louis A. Simon; John A. Weaver
- Architectural style: Moderne, Art Deco
- NRHP reference No.: 03001274
- Added to NRHP: December 10, 2003

Laurinburg Commercial Historic District is a national historic district located in Laurinburg, North Carolina. The district encompasses 51 contributing buildings and 2 contributing structures in the central business district of Laurinburg.

== History ==
Structures in the historic district were built between about 1893 and 1953 and include notable examples of Streamline Moderne and Art Deco architecture. Notable buildings include the Central Hotel (c. 1893), McDougald's Furniture Store and Funeral Parlor (c. 1904), Everington's Drug Store (c. 1904), Scotland Pharmacy (1935), U.S. Post Office (1939) designed by the Office of the Supervising Architect under Louis A. Simon and built by the Federal Works Administration, First United Methodist Church (1918), Hammond Company Building, and (former) Winn Dixie Grocery Store (1953).

It was added to the National Register of Historic Places in 2003.
