= John Blue House (Laurinburg, North Carolina) =

Historic house in North Carolina, United States

- U.S. National Register of Historic Places
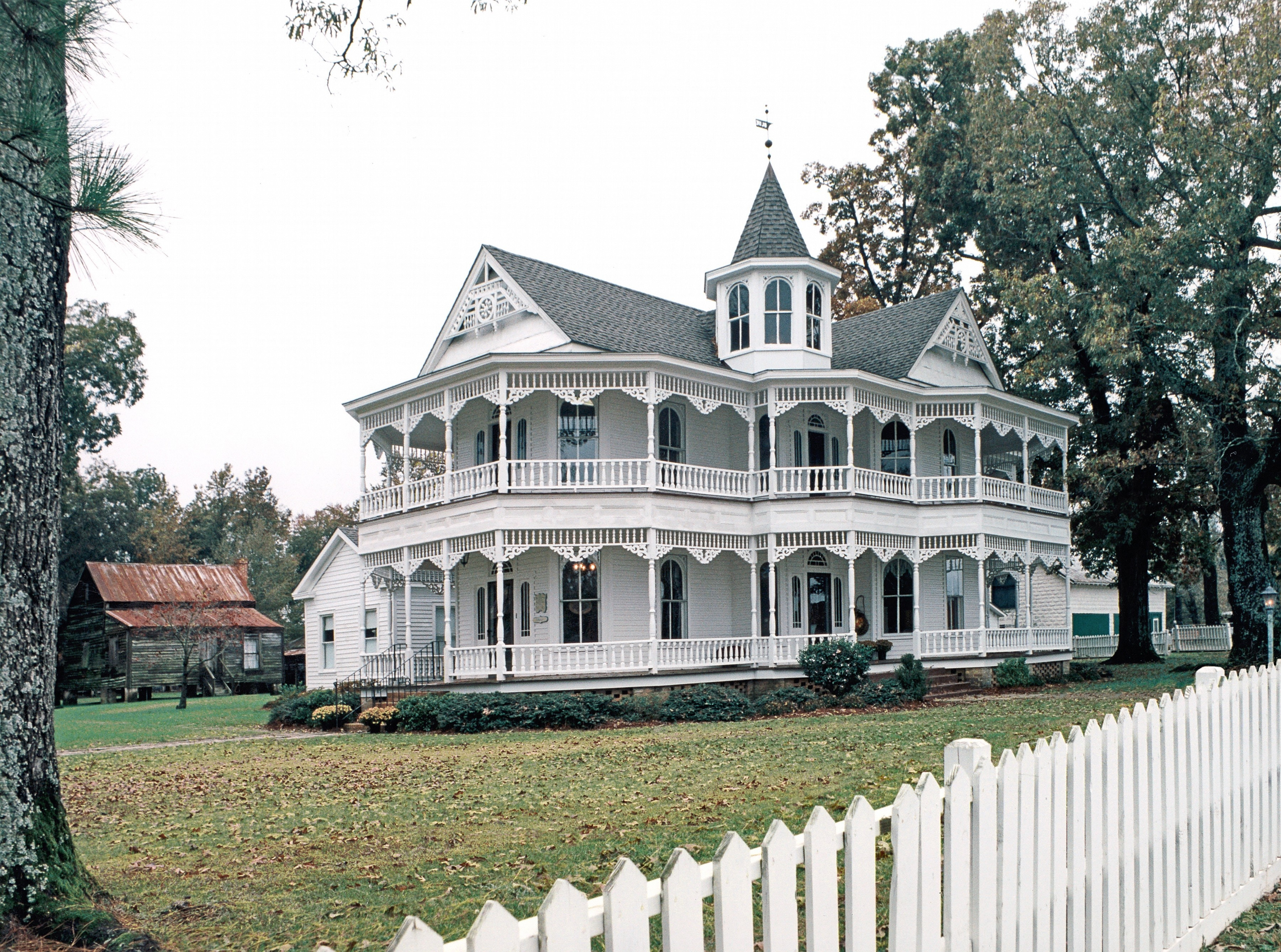

- Location within North Carolina Location within the United States
- Location: W of Laurinburg on SR 1108, near Laurinburg, North Carolina
- Coordinates: 34°45′26″N 79°29′56″W
- Area: 3 acres (1.2 ha)
- Built: 1895
- NRHP reference No.: 78003192
- Added to NRHP: December 8, 1978

John Blue House in Laurinburg, North Carolina was built in 1895. It was listed on the National Register of Historic Places (NRHP) in 1978.

A unique example of Steamboat Gothic architecture, the John Blue House provides a glimpse into the past of the rural Carolinas. The home features 12 exterior doors, each with its own stained glass light above. The house has nine fireplaces and rare double circular porches.

The surrounding grounds include a grove of pecan trees and a collection of structures that tell the story of a different time in the region. These structures include, three authentic log cabins, a restored pre-Civil War cotton gin, and a restored country store.

The grounds are always open and are used to host numerous festivals throughout the year; most notably the Storytelling Festival of Carolina, the Scotland County Highland Games and the John Blue Cotton Festival.

John Blue Cotton Festival -- The John Blue Cotton Festival is held the second weekend of October. It traditionally draws over 10,000 visitors. This "old timey" event features crafts, antique collections, "hit and miss" engines, entertainment, food, and demonstrations of 19th century games and farming practices.

== See also ==
- John Blue House (Aberdeen, North Carolina), also NRHP-listed
- Scotland County Highland Games, a Scottish event held at the John Blue House the first weekend in October.
