= Robert Nancy Monroe House =

Historic house in North Carolina, United States

- U.S. National Register of Historic Places
- Location within North Carolina Location within the United States
- Location: SR 1328, Silver Hill, North Carolina
- Coordinates: 34°53′10″N 79°28′50″W
- Area: 75 acres (30 ha)
- Built: 1912
- Built by: Smith, Marshall
- Architectural style: Queen Anne
- NRHP reference No.: 83001916
- Added to NRHP: March 17, 1983

Robert Nancy Monroe House is a historic home located near Silver Hill, a populated place within the Township of Laurel Hill in Scotland County, North Carolina, USA.

The house was built in 1912, during the prosperous period of the regional cotton boom. It is a 1½-story, three bay by three bay, Queen Anne style frame dwelling. It has a tall truncated-hip roof covered with decorat1ve metal shingles and pierced by two large, heavily corbeled, interior brick chimneys. It features a wrap-around porch with Tuscan order columns, imbricated wood shingles on its gables, dormers, and a three-stage rear tower.

It was added to the National Register of Historic Places in 1983.
