= Cal Shaw Stone Row House =

Historic house in Nevada, United States

- U.S. National Register of Historic Places
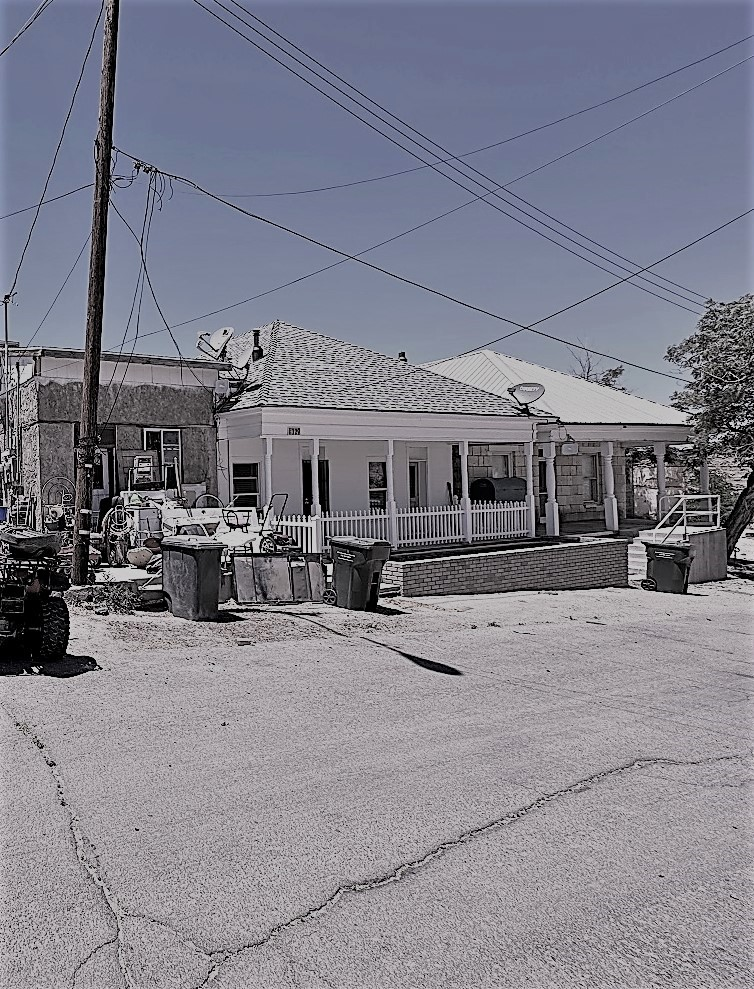

- Location within Nevada Location within the United States
- Location: Central St. Tonopah, Nevada
- Coordinates: 38.06852°N 117.23251°W
- Area: less than one acre
- Built: 1906
- Built by: Shaw, Cal
- MPS: Tonopah MRA
- NRHP reference No.: 82003242
- Added to NRHP: May 20, 1982

The Cal Shaw Stone Row House is a stone row house located on Central Street in Tonopah, Nevada, United States. Property owner Cal Shaw built the house in 1906 next to the Cal Shaw Adobe Duplex, which was built the previous year. While the house was built with stone instead of adobe, it features a similar design to the adobe house, particularly in its projecting roof and porch supported by columns. The house and its neighbor reflect the variety of homes built on Central Street, one of the earliest residential areas in Tonopah. In addition, the house's detailed and well-preserved design led a local historic survey to call it "one of the best preserved examples of stone residential construction in Tonopah".

The house was added to the National Register of Historic Places on May 20, 1982.
