= Laurel Hill Presbyterian Church =

Historic church in North Carolina, United States

- U.S. National Register of Historic Places
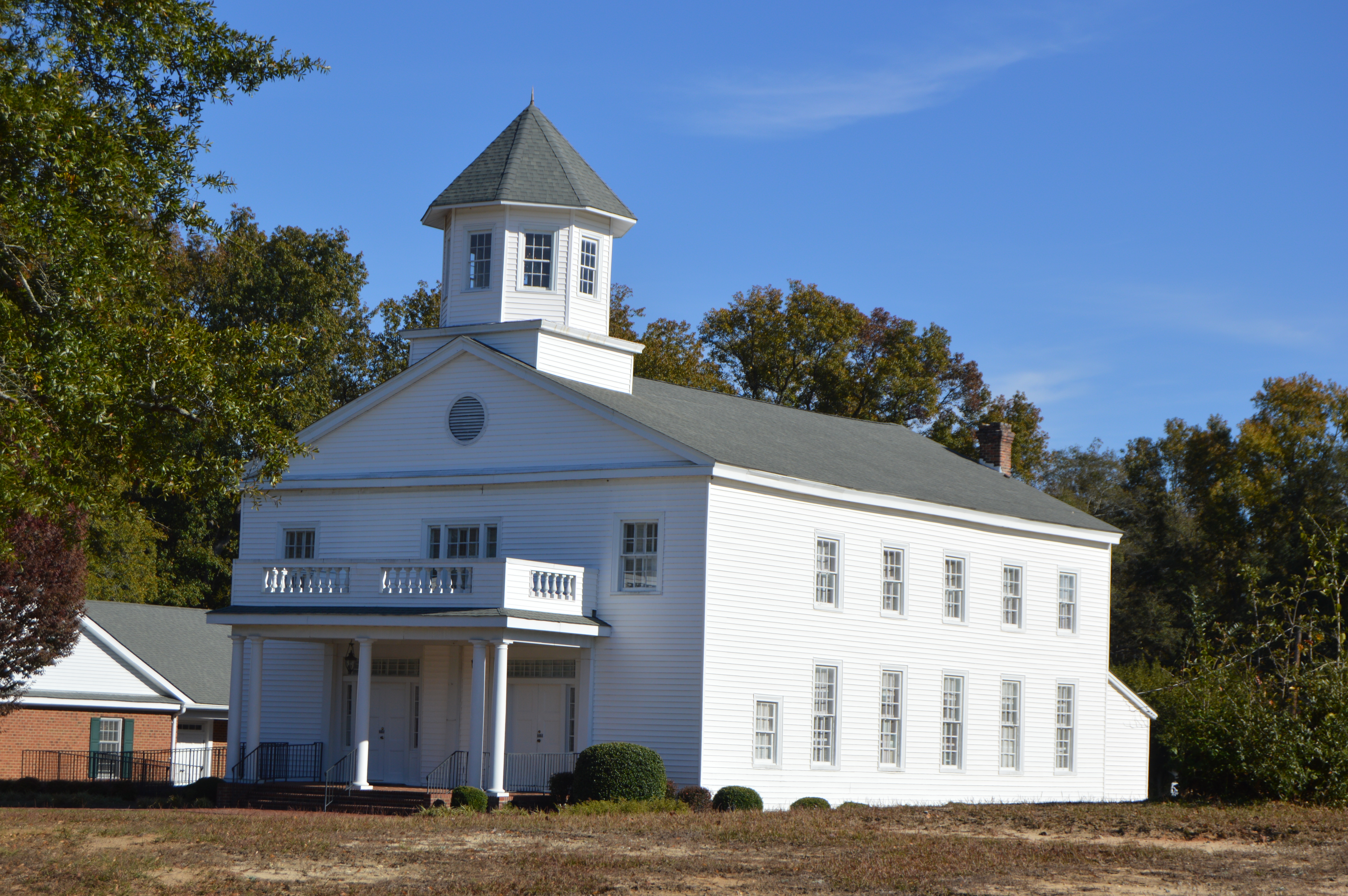
- Front and southwestern side

- Location within North Carolina Location within the United States
- Location: SR 1321 and SR 1323, near Laurinburg, North Carolina
- Coordinates: 34°49′57″N 79°27′52″W
- Area: 12 acres (4.9 ha)
- Built: 1856
- Architectural style: Greek Revival
- NRHP reference No.: 83001915
- Added to NRHP: August 18, 1983

Laurel Hill Presbyterian Church is a historic Presbyterian church near Laurinburg, Scotland County, North Carolina. The congregation was founded in 1797, and the current meeting house was completed in early 1856. It is a two-story, gable front Greek Revival style frame building. The land on which the church stands was donated by planter and politician Duncan McFarland. The current building was constructed between 1853 and 1856 by black freedman Jackson Graham under contract. The church was used for a short period by Union General William Tecumseh Sherman as his headquarters in March 1865 prior to the Battle of Bentonville. It is the oldest church building in Scotland County.

The congregation belongs to the Presbyterian Church (USA) denomination.

The building was added to the National Register of Historic Places in 1983.
