= Thomas J. Gill House =

Historic house in North Carolina, United States

- U.S. National Register of Historic Places
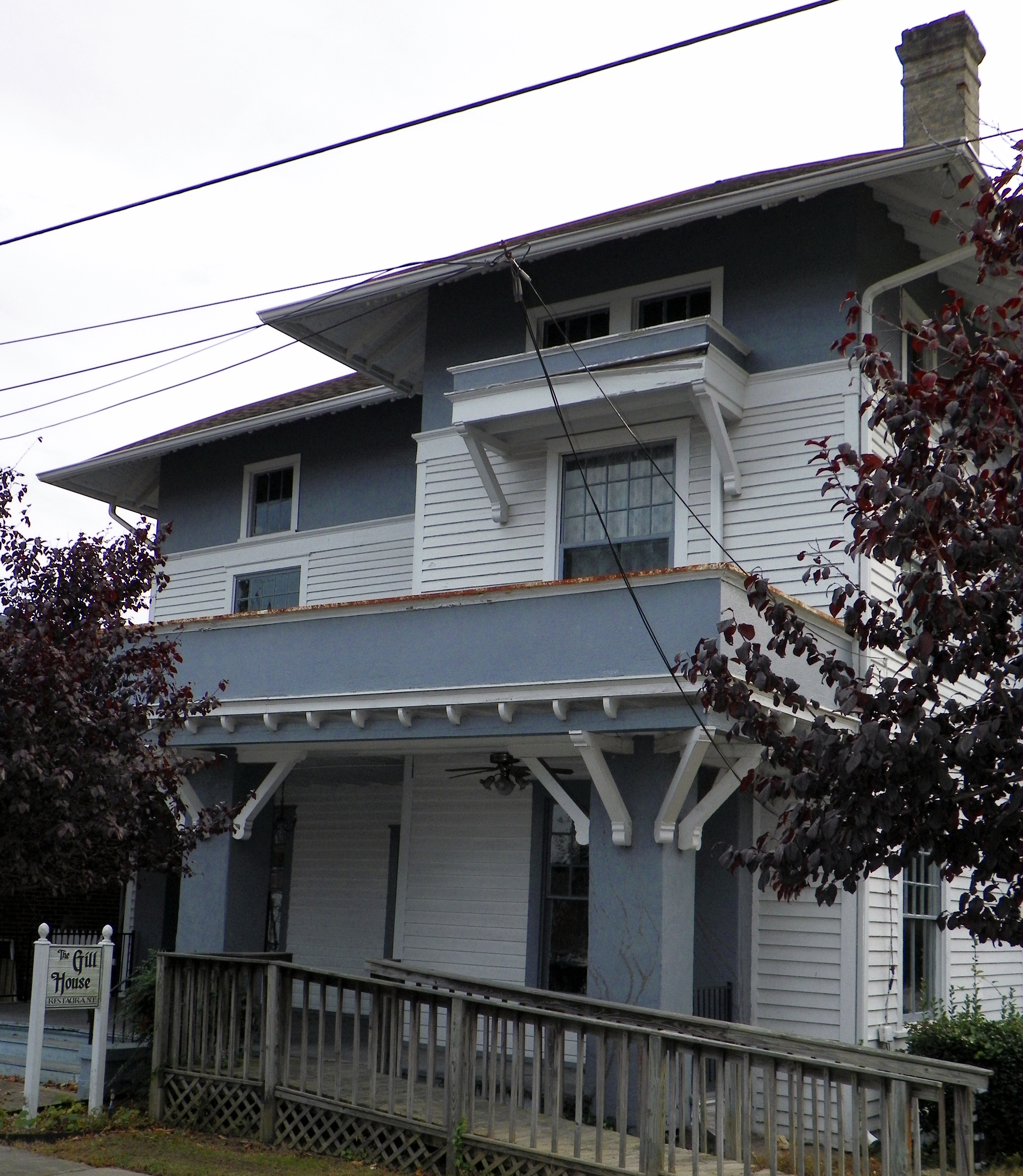
- Gill House, June 2011

- Location within North Carolina Location within the United States
- Location: 203 Cronly St., Laurinburg, North Carolina
- Coordinates: 34°46′31″N 79°27′50″W
- Area: 0.2 acres (0.081 ha)
- Built: 1904
- Architectural style: Colonial Revival, Bungalow/craftsman, Stick/eastlake
- NRHP reference No.: 82003513
- Added to NRHP: July 15, 1982

Thomas J. Gill House is a historic home located at Laurinburg, Scotland County, North Carolina. It was built in 1904, and is a 2 1/2-story, three bay by three bay, frame dwelling, with Stick Style and Bungalow design elements. The interior is in the Colonial Revival style. It has a hipped roof, exterior stucco and brackets, and full-width front porch. Also on the property is a contributing gazebo. It was the home of North Carolina State Treasurer Edwin M. Gill (1899-1978).

It was added to the National Register of Historic Places in 1982.
