= Shaw Mansion (New London, Connecticut) =

Historic house in Connecticut, United States

- U.S. National Register of Historic Places
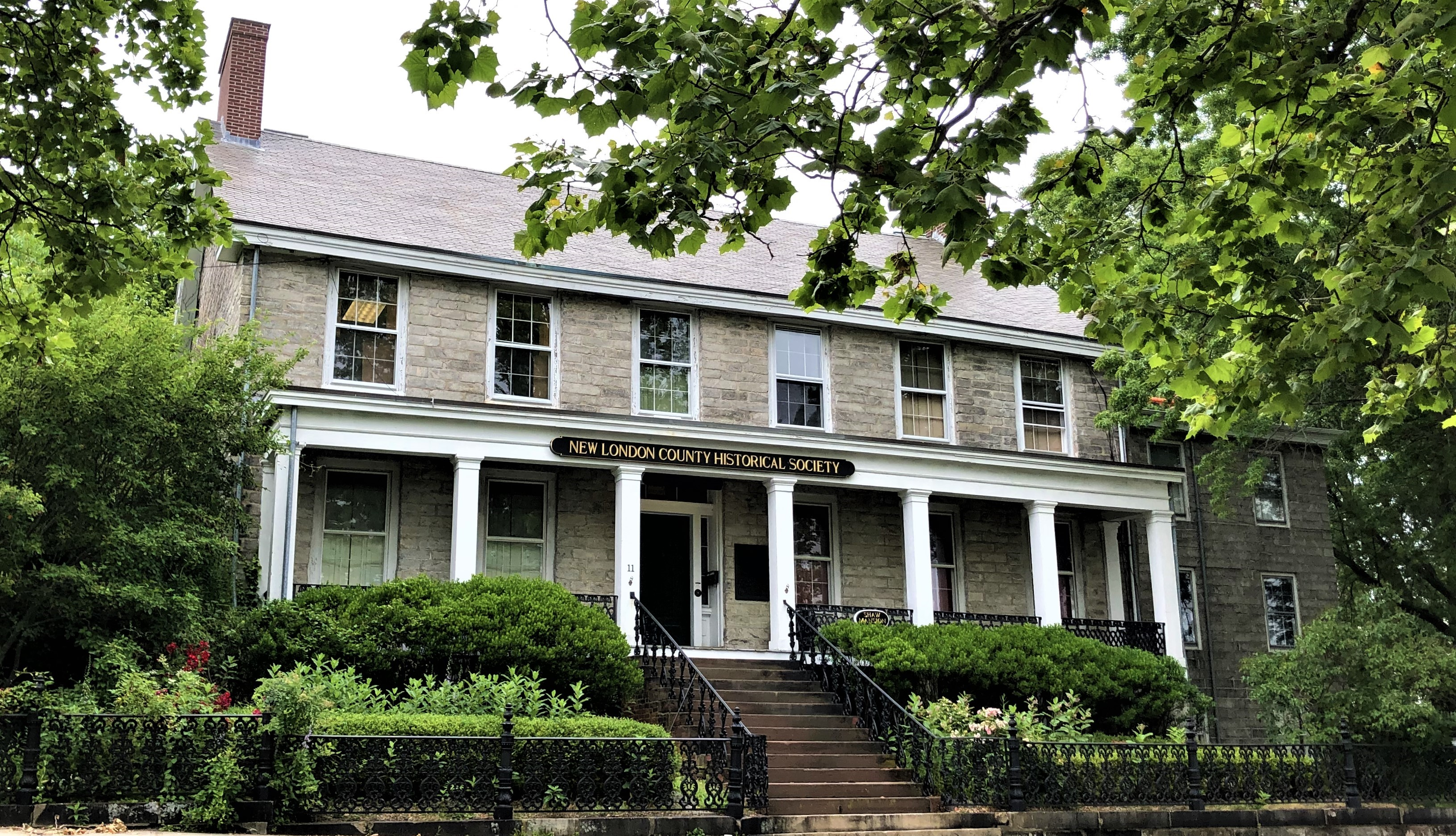
- (2022)

- Location within Connecticut Location within the United States
- Location: 11 Blinman Street, New London, Connecticut
- Coordinates: 41°21′2″N 72°6′6″W
- Area: 2 acres (0.81 ha)
- Built: 1756
- Architectural style: Georgian
- NRHP reference No.: 70000713
- Added to NRHP: December 29, 1970

The Shaw Mansion, also known as the Shaw-Perkins Mansion and as the Shaw Mansion Museum, is a historic mansion and house museum at 11 Blinman Street between Bank and Brewer Streets in New London, Connecticut. Built in 1756 for Nathaniel Shaw Sr., it is a well-preserved example of a wealthy merchant's house, made further notable as the location of the state's naval offices during the American Revolutionary War. The headquarters and museum of the New London County Historical Society have been located in the Shaw Mansion since 1907.

The house was added to the National Register of Historic Places in 1970.

== Description and history ==
The Shaw Mansion stands overlooking New London's southern downtown waterfront, on the north side of Blinman Street at Bank Street. It is a large three-story granite structure, whose main block is six bays wide, with a single-story porch extending across its width. A three-story granite wing extends the main block to the right at a recess. The interior follows a central hall plan, with a two-stage staircase in the central hall that has a fine mahogany banister and balustrade.

The house was built in 1756 for Nathaniel Shaw Sr. with the labor of Acadians who had been brought to New London as refugees from the English Expulsion of the Acadians from Nova Scotia furing the French and Indian Wars. Nathaniel Jr. was appointed Connecticut's Naval War Agent; at the time, the state had its own navy, but far more effective and lucrative was privateering, the capturing of enemy ships by private individuals. New Londoners captured 155 prize ships during the war, which was one of the reasons behind Benedict Arnold's attack in the Battle of Groton Heights, and the burning of New London. The house caught fire, but local legend has it that the fire was put out by a neighbor using vinegar. The neighbor's house – which is no longer extant – came to be called the "vinegar house".

However it happened, the house survived the fires, suffering only the loss of a wood-frame annex, which was afterwards rebuilt in granite in 1840. The single-story porch across the front was added in the mid-19th century.

Nathaniel Jr. died in a hunting accident in 1792, and the house passed to the Perkins family through the marriage of Shaw's niece. The house remained in the Shaw family until 1907, when it was acquired by the New London Historical Society – although members of the Shaw family continued to live in the house even after the purchase. The society was founded in 1870. The house is now operated as a museum and is the repository of antiques and its extensive research library.

== See also ==
- National Register of Historic Places listings in New London County, Connecticut
