= Shaw Farm (Ross, Ohio) =

- U.S. National Register of Historic Places
- Location within Ohio Location within the United States
- Nearest city: Ross, Ohio
- Coordinates: 39°18′25″N 84°40′22″W
- Architect: Albin Shaw
- NRHP reference No.: 74001405
- Added to NRHP: 1974-07-24

Shaw Farm is a registered historic building near Ross, Ohio, listed in the National Register on 1974-07-24.

It includes the first stone house built in Butler County.

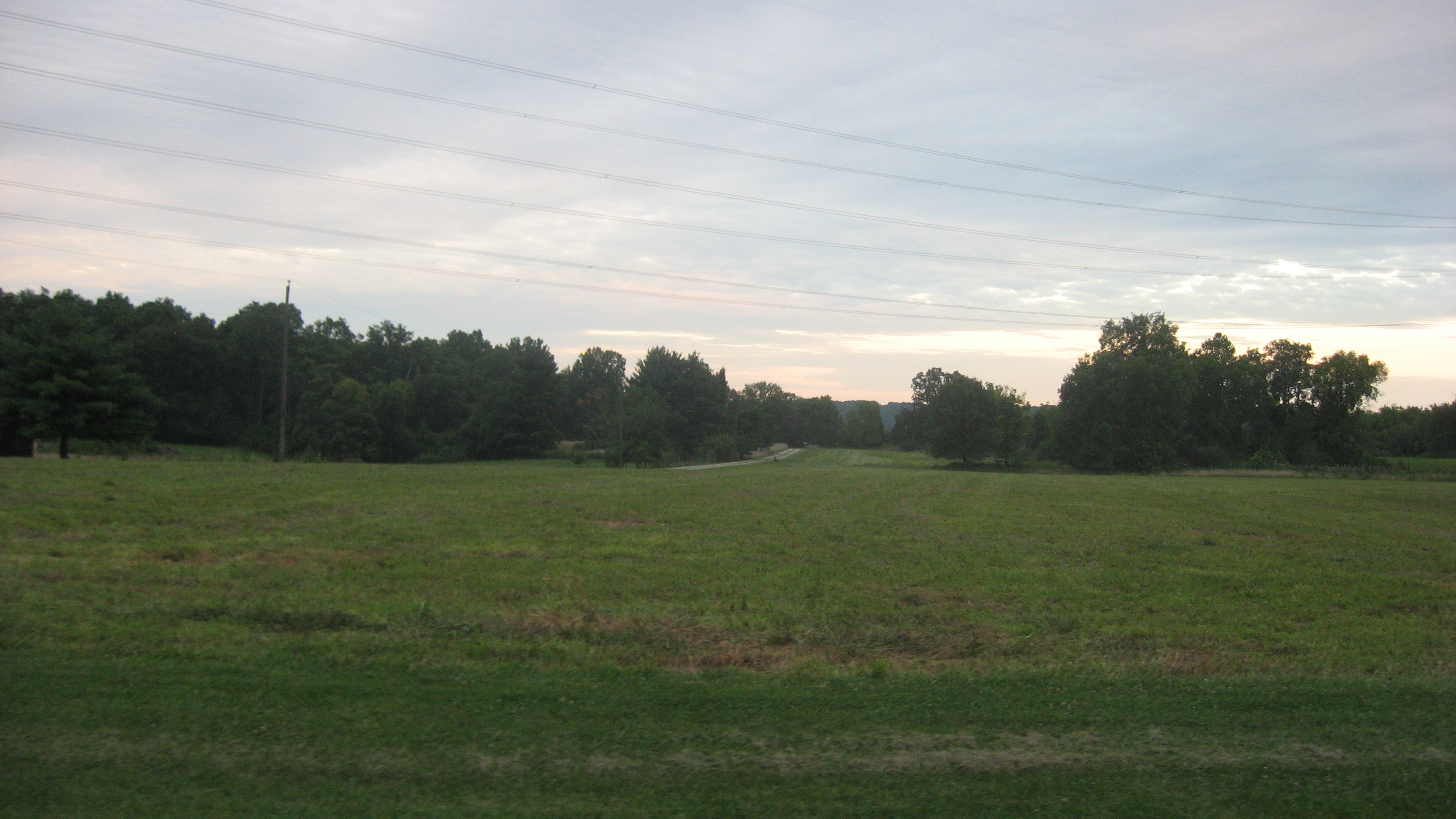
Driveway towards the farm, not showing any contributing resources

== Historic uses ==
- Single Dwelling
