= Grandfather Mountain Highland Games =

The Grandfather Mountain Highland Games is a Highland games event that has been held annually since 1956 at Grandfather Mountain, North Carolina. Celebrating the history and culture of Scots in North Carolina, it is among the first and largest modern Highland games established in the United States. Competitions and displays take place in Scottish styles of piping, drumming, costume, dance, and traditional sports.

== History ==
=== Highland games in North Carolina ===
The Scottish people have a long and rich history in the state of North Carolina. After the Battle of Culloden in 1746, Highland Clearances left many Scottish clans with no home. During the time after the clearances, North Carolina became one of the most popular destinations. The local government in North Carolina urged Highland Scots to come to North Carolina by offering them land and tax exemptions. At first, many groups kept to the eastern shores of North Carolina, but as populations in the states rose, many went west in search of farm land and more space. During the revolutionary war, Scottish immigrants fought on both sides. The most famous Scottish resident of North Carolina was Flora Macdonald, who immigrated the then-colony after the battle of Culloden and lived in Harnett County from 1774 to 1778. After the war, many Scottish Loyalists left the states to go back to Scotland and others went on to Nova Scotia, Canada. However, a large group of Scots remained in North Carolina.

The Scots kept their Highland culture alive in the United States, speaking Scottish Gaelic among their families and in church. The Scots were unable to legally practice their cultural heritage in Scotland after Culloden, as the Act of Proscription 1746 banned the Highlanders from possessing arms or wearing Highland dress. In response, the Scots in America sought to keep their traditions alive. Highland gatherings were a part of the lives of every Scot in North Carolina. At the very beginning they were used as a time to trade with others, baptize their children, get married and pass along information. The language and culture remained an active part of their lives in the US until after the American Civil War, when much of the culture became assimilated into the developing American culture. However, the loss of the Scottish culture in North Carolina did not go unnoticed. In 1956, the Highland games returned to North Carolina as a modern event.

=== Grandfather Mountain Highland Games ===
In 1956, Agnes MacRae Morton of Linville, North Carolina, and Donald F. MacDonald of Charlotte, North Carolina, co-founded the Grandfather Mountain Highland Games. Donald MacDonald's vision for the games was based on the Royal Braemar Gathering, which he'd attended a few years before in Scotland in 1954. The Braemar Games had been held there for several hundred years and the Grandfather Mountain Games was often later called "America's Braemar". It was special in many ways, by boasting an oval track in which traditional foot races could be held, along with the heavy events in the inner field. The site became a favorite among games attendees very fast for its striking resemblance to the Highlands of Scotland. The MacRae family owned the land where the games were held at the foot of Grandfather Mountain in Linville, North Carolina. The MacRae family actually founded the town of Linville in 1892 and had always wanted to have a Highland gathering there, even if just a small event. In 1955, Morton contacted Donald MacDonald, who at the time was working for The Charlotte News and had also founded the Clan Donald Society not long before that as well as helping establish a Robert Burns Society of Charlotte. Knowing his dedication to Scottish culture, Morton set out to convince him to help her start Highland games in North Carolina. MacDonald agreed and the first games were held on August 19, 1956, on the anniversary of the landing of Bonnie Prince Charlie in Scotland and the beginning of the Jacobite rising of 1745.

The two set out to model the games after what MacDonald remembered from the Braemar games and using the program he had brought back with him. The very first games were only one day in length with two bands and a small group of competitions. The games were small at first with only 1500 attendees, but became popular quickly and Highland games began spreading throughout the country modeled after the Grandfather Mountain Games.

== Today's games ==
The stated mission for the Grandfather Mountain Highland Games is:

To carry on and promote the annual Grandfather Mountain Highland Games and Gathering of Scottish Clans, to foster and restore interest in traditional dancing, piping, drumming, athletic achievement, music and Gaelic culture, and to establish scholarship funds to assist students from Avery County High School to study at American colleges and universities.

The Grandfather Mountain Highland Games is one of the largest in the country, continuously drawing a crowd of over 30,000. It has only recently been surpassed by the Highland games in Pleasanton, California. In 2006, the event celebrated its 50th anniversary. But no event was held in 2020 due to the COVID-19 pandemic.

The event takes place over four days at MacRae Meadows on Grandfather Mountain. Some people stay in hotels while visiting, while others set up camp sites around MacRae Meadows.

=== Events ===
==== The torchlight ceremony ====
Also called "calling of the clans", the torchlight ceremony is a ceremony that long ago was used to call the clans to battle. In this ceremony, each clan brings its torch to announce itself as being present at the games and adds its own torch to the larger bonfire in the center of the field. The ceremony typically begins after sundown and is accompanied by music and piping.

==== The Presentation of Tartans ====
The final day of the games begins with a worship ceremony that includes the "kirkin’ of the tartans" ceremony and then the presentation of tartans begins. The Presentation of tartans includes every clan attending the games. Each clan gathers some of its most important members and they parade around the track along with several piping bands, presenting their banner to the honored clan and esteemed hosts and guests. The games typically attract more than 120 different clans each year.

==== Competitions ====
===== Piping and drumming =====
A wide variety of piping and drumming competitions takes place on the East Meadow. Piping events include: piobaireachd, march, Strathspey & reel, hornpipe, and jig. Piping competitions are held in multiple sections. Divisions include Open (Professional) and Amateur I-IV. Drumming events include: march, Strathspey and reel, tenor, bass, drum pad, etc. Like piping, drumming competitions are held in multiple sections. Division again include Open (Professional) and Amateur I-IV. There are also specific divisions for tenor drum.

===== Dancing =====
The Grandfather Mountain Highland Games has been designated by the Scottish Official Board of Highland Dancing as the official site of the Atlantic International championship. Each dancer must dance four separate dances laid down by the Board of Highland Dancing and each is judged accordingly. People come from all over the world to compete and also to watch the best dancers in the nation compete. The United States Inter-regional Championship has been held at the games twice in the past, thanks to retired dance director Anne Andrews. Pat Johnston is the director of dance now, and has recently restarted a dance camp in the mountains (a week before the games) by the dreams of Sally Southerland. There is also the chance for everyone to try out their highland dancing skills at the many evening events that feature piping and Highland reels.

===== Games =====
Besides the traditional track sports, there are several heavy sports competitions that take place throughout the games. One of the best parts about the games is that people of all ages and skill can participate in the games. There is a day for professional competitors and one for amateurs and over 40 competitors as well. In addition, the children at the festival can also have the chance to practice their own skills at traditional Highland games. Competitions include the hammer throw, weight toss, caber toss, sheaf toss, Highland wrestling, kilted mile run, and the clan tug of war.

Two well known foot races became the first “events” of the games. The marathon was a 26-mile-long race beginning in Boone, North Carolina, and ending at MacRae Meadows with the runners finishing on the track and was held on Saturday morning of the Games weekend. The Bear was a 5-mile foot race that began at the bottom of Grandfather Mountain and ended at the top of the mountain at the well known Grandfather Mountain Swinging Bridge, a taxing 1500-foot climb held on Thursday before the opening ceremonies. The opening ceremonies moved to Thursday evening with the Torchlight Ceremony ending that day's events. After a tragic accident happened at the start of the Bear competition in 2022 both foot races and the Grizzly, a bike race, were canceled permanently.

In addition to the competitive games, one of the crowd favorites is the exhibitions of sheep herding with Border Collies on the playing field. The crowds are often delighted by the skill of the Border Collies that herd the sheep across the field and into a penned area.

==== Music ====
There are numerous music events at the games. The annual ceilidh and tartan ball features traditional music and dance. There is also a bagpipe concert that features some of the best pipers from around the country. The festival also offers two concerts, a Celtic jam and a Celtic rock concert on the second and third nights of the games. Each day there are three "Celtic groves" that feature music of different types. Each grove has its own flavor, from the more traditional to the more modern rock groups. The Gaelic Mod is another traditional form of Gaelic speaking that takes place at the games. During the mod, competitors sing traditional Gaelic songs, and is held to encourage the use of the Scottish Gaelic language throughout the world. There is an extensive summer school for bagpiping and drumming during the weeks leading up to and after the games at the historic Conference Center in Valle Crucis, North Carolina.

==== Food and vendors ====
At each Grandfather Mountain Highland Games, there are numerous vendors selling items such as kilts, hats, swords, and daggers. Vendors from all over the region come to sell arts and crafts with a Scottish theme. Traditional Scottish dishes are available such as haggis, bridies, and fish and chips. There are also vendors selling packaged food that is difficult to find in the US such as Cadbury candy, shepherds pie mix, and Highland honey.

==== Clan tents ====
Each clan represented at the games sets up a tent for visitors. At most tents, clan organizations have sign-up forms for membership and often have clothing and memorabilia with the clan's crest.

== See also ==
- Scotland County Highland Games (North Carolina)

== External resources ==
- Grandfather Mountain Highland Games
- Avery County, North Carolina
- Grandfather Mountain
- Library of Congress Local Legacies
- National Geographic
- North Carolina History
- Visit North Carolina
