= Shaw Farm (Bayfield County, Wisconsin) =

- U.S. National Register of Historic Places
- Location: Sand Island
- Nearest city: Bayfield, Wisconsin
- Coordinates: 46°57′47″N 90°56′03″W
- Area: 1.5 acres (0.61 ha)
- Built: 1900
- Built by: Francis Shaw
- Architectural style: Log Cabin
- NRHP reference No.: 76000052
- Added to NRHP: June 18, 1976

Shaw Farm is located on Sand Island of the Apostle Islands National Lakeshore.

== History ==
The farm was originally owned by Francis Shaw. It was later owned by Fred C. Andersen, President of Andersen Frame Company. The farm was listed on the National Register of Historic Places in 1976. Later, it was added to the Wisconsin State Register of Historic Places in 1989.
