= Wagram, North Carolina =

- Town
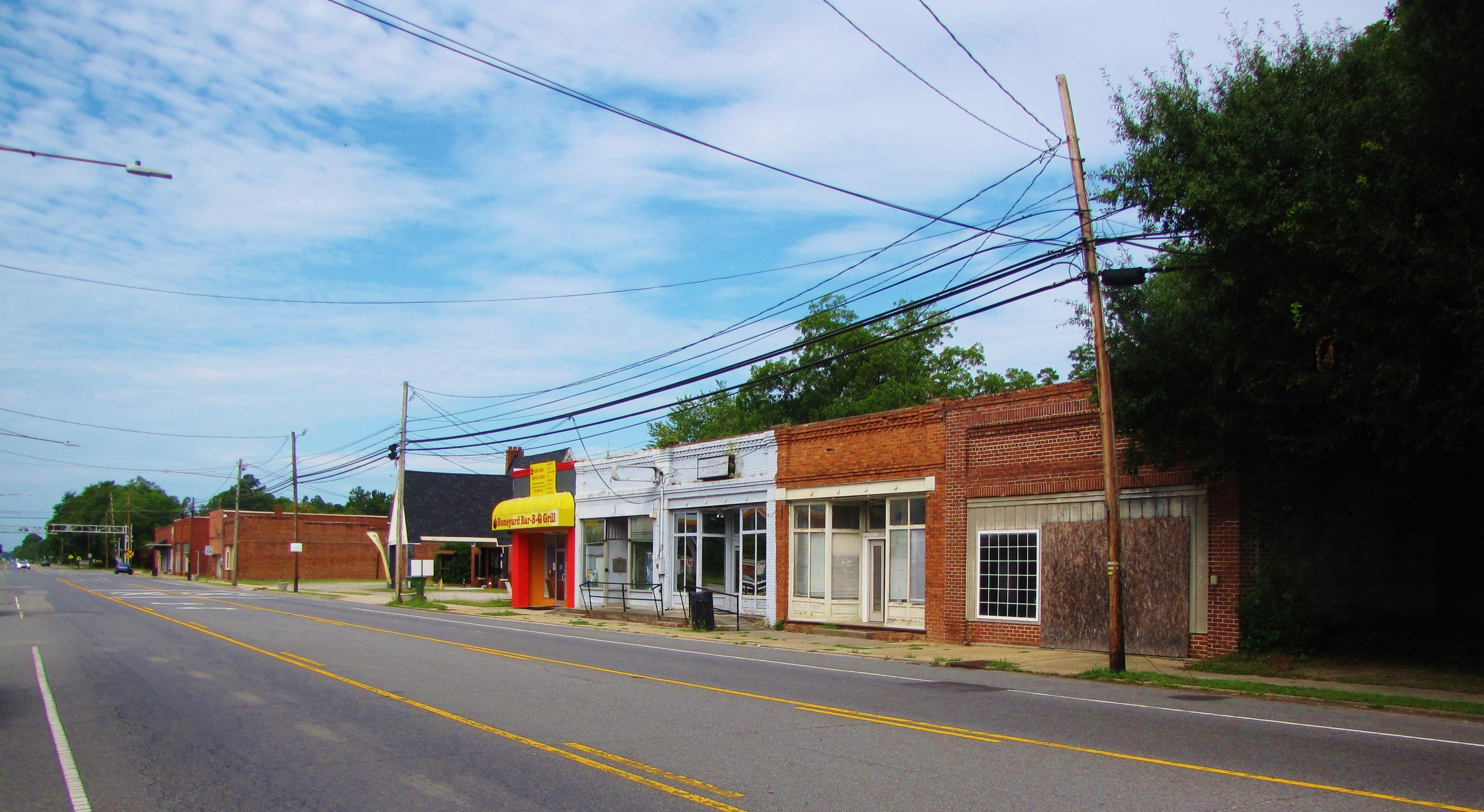
- Main Street

- Location in Scotland County and the state of North Carolina.
- Coordinates: 34°53′20″N 79°21′55″W
- Country: United States
- State: North Carolina
- County: Scotland

Government
  - Mayor: Milton Farmer

Area
  - Total: 1.46 sq mi (3.77 km^{2})
  - Land: 1.46 sq mi (3.77 km^{2})
  - Water: 0 sq mi (0.00 km^{2})
- Elevation: 240 ft (73 m)

Population (2020)
  - Total: 615
  - Density: 422.1/sq mi (162.97/km^{2})
- Time zone: UTC-5 (Eastern (EST))
  - Summer (DST): UTC-4 (EDT)
- ZIP code: 28396
- Area codes: 910, 472
- FIPS code: 37-70480
- GNIS feature ID: 2406815
- Website: https://www.townofwagram.net/

Wagram (/ˈweɪɡrəm/ WAY-grum) is a town in Scotland County, North Carolina, United States. The population was 615 at the 2020 census. The town was named for the Battle of Wagram, a Napoleonic battle at Deutsch-Wagram in Austria.

== History ==
The community was incorporated as Wagram in 1911. The Richmond Temperance and Literary Society Hall and Shaw Family Farms are listed on the National Register of Historic Places. In 2007 the town erected a community recreation center.

== Geography ==
According to the United States Census Bureau, the town has a total area of 1.5 square miles (3.9 km^{2}), all of it land.

== Demographics ==
Historical population
Census	Pop.	Note	%±
1920	174		—
1930	309		77.6%
1940	388		25.6%
1950	397		2.3%
1960	562		41.6%
1970	718		27.8%
1980	617		−14.1%
1990	480		−22.2%
2000	801		66.9%
2010	840		4.9%
2020	615		−26.8%
U.S. Decennial Census

As of the census of 2000, there were 801 people, 307 households, and 224 families residing in the town. The population density was 545.8 inhabitants per square mile (210.7/km^{2}). There were 361 housing units at an average density of 246.0 per square mile (95.0/km^{2}). The racial makeup of the town was 45.32% White, 48.06% African American, 4.62% Native American, 0.50% Asian, 0.37% from other races, and 1.12% from two or more races. Hispanic or Latino of any race were 0.62% of the population.

There were 307 households, out of which 28.7% had children under the age of 18 living with them, 49.2% were married couples living together, 20.2% had a female householder with no husband present, and 27.0% were non-families. 23.5% of all households were made up of individuals, and 11.4% had someone living alone who was 65 years of age or older. The average household size was 2.61 and the average family size was 3.09.

In the town, the population was spread out, with 26.8% under the age of 18, 7.2% from 18 to 24, 23.6% from 25 to 44, 27.7% from 45 to 64, and 14.6% who were 65 years of age or older. The median age was 40 years. For every 100 females, there were 82.5 males. For every 100 females age 18 and over, there were 75.4 males.

The median income for a household in the town was $39,583, and the median income for a family was $44,615. Males had a median income of $30,809 versus $19,107 for females. The per capita income for the town was $16,089. About 14.3% of families and 18.7% of the population were below the poverty line, including 24.9% of those under age 18 and 32.6% of those age 65 or over.

== Notable people ==
- Mary H. Odom, North Carolina state legislator and educator, lived in Wagram.
- Lucius "Tawl" Ross, Funkadelic guitarist, was born in Wagram.
