= Shaw Family Farms =

Historic farm in North Carolina, United States

- U.S. National Register of Historic Places
- U.S. Historic district
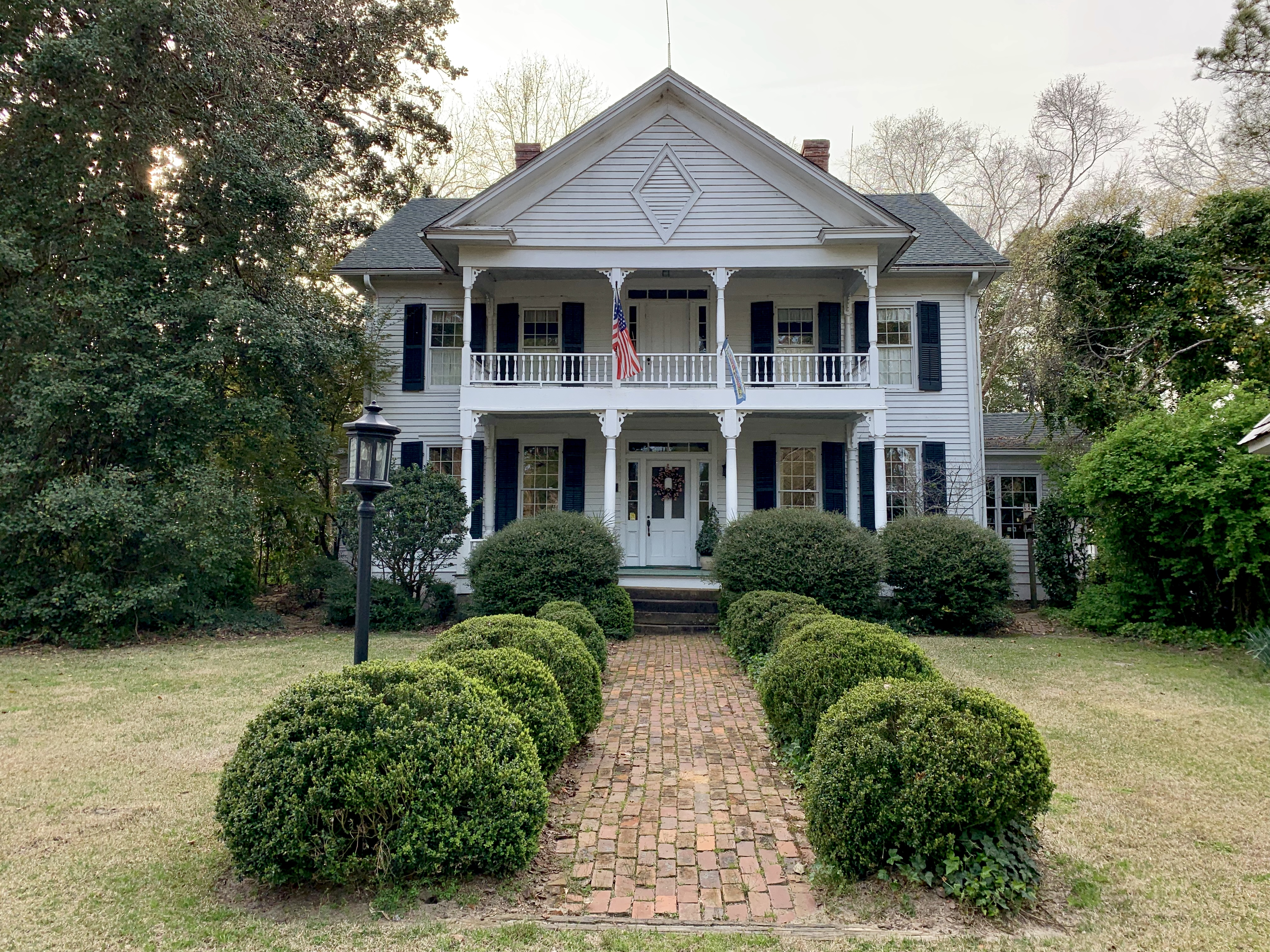
- Dr. Daniel Shaw House (c. 1885

- Location within North Carolina Location within the United States
- Location: SR 1405, near Wagram, North Carolina
- Coordinates: 34°52′30″N 79°23′54″W
- Area: 584.3 acres (236.5 ha)
- Built: 1885
- Architectural style: Greek Revival, Queen Anne
- NRHP reference No.: 83003999
- Added to NRHP: October 13, 1983

Shaw Family Farms are historic family farms and a national historic district located near Wagram, Scotland County, North Carolina. The district encompasses 16 contributing buildings and 2 contributing structures. They include three houses: The Dr. Daniel Shaw House, a large two-story, double-pile house with a dominant double tier gable portico built about 1885 with a Greek Revival interior; the Alexander Edwin Shaw House, a rambling one-story vernacular frame dwelling with an extensive Victorian wraparound porch also built about 1885; and the Dr. William Graham Shaw House, a one-story house of traditional local form, treated with a variety of simplified Queen Anne elements and built in 1900. Also on the farms are a number of contributing agricultural outbuildings.

It was added to the National Register of Historic Places in 1983.
