= Carroll County =

Carroll County may refer to:

- Carroll County, Arkansas
- Carroll County, Georgia
- Carroll County, Illinois
- Carroll County, Indiana
- Carroll County, Iowa
- Carroll County, Kentucky
- Carroll County, Maryland
- Carroll County, Mississippi
- Carroll County, Missouri
- Carroll County, New Hampshire
- Carroll County, Ohio
- Carroll County, Tennessee
- Carroll County, Virginia

== See also ==
- "The Carroll County Accident", a 1968 country and western song written by Bob Ferguson and recorded by Porter Wagoner
- East Carroll Parish, Louisiana
- West Carroll Parish, Louisiana
- Carroll County Airport (disambiguation)
- Carroll County Courthouse (disambiguation)
- Carroll County High School (disambiguation)
- Carroll County Public Schools (disambiguation)
