= National Register of Historic Places listings in Carroll County, Kentucky =

Location of Carroll County in Kentucky

This is a list of the National Register of Historic Places listings in Carroll County, Kentucky.

This is intended to be a complete list of the properties and districts on the National Register of Historic Places in Carroll County, Kentucky, United States. The locations of National Register properties and districts for which the latitude and longitude coordinates are included below, may be seen in a map.

There are 11 properties and districts listed on the National Register in the county.

This National Park Service list is complete through NPS recent listings posted June 13, 2025.

== Current ==
	Name on the Register	Image	Date listed	Location	City or town	Description
1	Paschal Todd Baker House	Paschal Todd Baker House	November 25, 1980 (#80001496)	406 Highland Ave. 38°40′50″N 85°10′53″W	Carrollton	No longer extant.
2	Gen. William O. Butler House	Gen. William O. Butler House	May 28, 1976 (#76000861)	Highland Ave. 38°40′54″N 85°10′31″W	Carrollton	
3	Carrollton Historic District	Carrollton Historic District	November 12, 1982 (#82001553)	Roughly bounded by Main, Polk, 2nd, 7th, and both sides of Highland Ave. to 11th St. 38°40′45″N 85°10′40″W	Carrollton	
4	Ghent Historic District	Ghent Historic District	August 25, 1983 (#83002623)	U.S. Route 42, Fishing, Ann, Main Cross, Ferry, Water, Union, and Liberty Sts. 38°44′18″N 85°03′36″W	Ghent	
5	Grass Hills		August 22, 1975 (#75000743)	5 miles southeast of Ghent on Kentucky Route 47 at Interstate 71; 38°40′21″N 85°00′26″W	Ghent	
6	Hunter's Bottom Historic District	Hunter's Bottom Historic District	August 11, 1976 (#76000862)	West of Carrollton; 38°43′23″N 85°17′31″W	Carrollton	Extends into Trimble County
7	Richard Masterson House	Richard Masterson House	July 1, 1975 (#75000742)	East of the junction of U.S. Routes 42 and 227; 38°41′20″N 85°09′05″W	Carrollton	
8	Henry Ogburn House	Henry Ogburn House	January 8, 1987 (#87000149)	Off U.S. Route 42; 38°41′29″N 85°07′57″W	Carrollton	
9	Richlawn Farm	Richlawn Farm	March 24, 2000 (#00000274)	1705 Highland Ave. 38°41′11″N 85°09′32″W	Carrollton	
10	Stone House on Kentucky River		January 8, 1987 (#87000151)	Kentucky Route 55; 38°40′21″N 85°11′39″W	Prestonville	
11	Turpin House		December 2, 1977 (#77000606)	Butler State Park off 11th St. 38°40′09″N 85°09′56″W	Carrollton	

== See also ==
- List of National Historic Landmarks in Kentucky
- National Register of Historic Places listings in Kentucky
