= Kentucky Scottish Weekend =

Highland games event in Carrollton, Kentucky

A vendor demonstrating roses fashioned from leather at the 2007 Kentucky Scottish Weekend (photo taken 5/12/07)

The Kentucky Scottish Weekend was a regional Highland games event held annually at General Butler State Resort Park in Carrollton, Kentucky. The weekend's mission was to celebrate the customs and traditions of Scotland. It was held each year on the second full weekend in May. First held in 1983, the weekend celebrated its thirtieth anniversary in 2012, its final year. It was the longest running highland game currently being held in Kentucky at the time it ended. It was held in Carrollton due to that location being nearly halfway between Louisville and Cincinnati. A Kentucky non-profit corporation—Kentucky Scottish Weekend, Inc.—held the event. The weekend was sometimes referred to as "KSW" for short.

The weekend was one of three regional Highland games in Kentucky. The others are the Glasgow Highland Games in Glasgow and the West Kentucky Highland Festival in Murray, founded in 1986 and 1998, respectively.

A variety of vendors usually attended the event. Items sold included Scottish and American food items, Celtic collectibles, kilts, Scottish music, Clan memorabilia, and Scottish heathers.

== Events ==
Jesse Andrews, President of the Kentucky Scottish Weekend, leading the Parade of Tartans at the 2007 weekend (photo taken 5/12/07)

- Athletic competitions, including:
  - Caber tossing
  - Hammer throw – 22 lb (10.0 kg).
  - Sheaf toss
  - Stone throw
  - Weight throw – 28 and 56 lb (25 kg).
  - Weight toss – 56 lb (25 kg).
- Bagpipe and drumming competitions (the event was recognized by the Eastern United States Pipe Band Association)
  - Several regional pipe bands regularly competed at the weekend, including Cincinnati Caledonian Pipes and Drums and the Louisville Pipe Band
- Bonniest knees contest (where men competed for the "best" set of knees; judged by females and through touch alone)
- Border Collie demonstrations
- British car show
- Ceilidh on Saturday night
- Clan booths
- Kirking of the Tartan (non-denominational church service) on Sunday morning
- Opening ceremony with massed bands
- Parade of Tartans
- Pipe band concerts
- Scottish folk music concerts
- Scottish highland dancing competitions and demonstrations
- Wellie toss contest (where women competed to see who can throw a boot the farthest)

== Entertainers ==
Alex Beaton had been the featured performer and emcee at the Kentucky Scottish Weekend since 1989. In later years, other performers included Seven Nations, the Glengarry Bhoys, and Wicked Tinkers.

== Dissolution ==
KSW was dissolved and the remaining funds disbursed to The Scottish Society of Louisville.
