= Ghent Historic District =

Ghent Historic District may refer to: (sorted by state, then city/town)

- Ghent Historic District (Ghent, Kentucky), listed on the National Register of Historic Places (NRHP) in Carroll County, Kentucky
- Ghent Historic District (New Bern, North Carolina), listed on the NRHP in Craven County, North Carolina
- Ghent Historic District (Ghent, Ohio), listed on the NRHP in Summit County, Ohio
- Ghent Historic District (Norfolk, Virginia), NRHP-listed
