= Thomas Langford Butler =

U.S. Army officer (1789–1880)

- Born: April 10, 1789; Kentucky
- Died: October 21, 1880 (aged 91); Louisville, Kentucky

Thomas Langford Butler (April 10, 1789 – October 21, 1880) was an early 19th-century United States Army officer and Kentucky state legislator, serving in the Kentucky General Assembly in 1826 and 1847. He and several of his family members were closely associated with Andrew Jackson before and after the Battle of New Orleans. In 1859, he built the Butler-Turpin House at what is now General Butler State Resort Park in Kentucky.

== Biography ==
Butler was born April 10, 1789, at Lexington, Kentucky, or Jessamine County, when Kentucky was still part of Virginia. He was a son of Mildred Hawkins and Percival Butler of the Fighting Butlers. John Todd was an uncle on his mother's side. He was the oldest son of the 10 children, five boys and five girls, including 1848 U.S. vice presidential candidate William O. Butler. In 1796, his family moved to Port William, Kentucky, now Carrollton, Kentucky. He went to "Rankin's school at Lexington," where his teachers were Reverends Bishop and Sharp. He studied business with Thomas Bodley, and "here he became the expert accountant and correct business man that distinguished him throughout his life." He studied for a few months at Transylvania University.

In 1809, at age 20, he received a second lieutenant's commission in the light artillery section of the regular United States army and was stationed at Fort Massac. In August 1811 he resigned that commission and in October 1812 was appointed quartermaster by Gen. Harrison for the Indiana Territory and Illinois Territory with headquarters at Vincennes. In 1813, he was commissioned a captain, raised a company, marched north, and participated in the battle of the Thames. He served in the 28th regiment of the regular army in the Northwestern Campaign under Harrison.

According to a profile of 1878, "Taken down with rheumatism, he was brought home on a litter, and after his recovery joined General Andrew Jackson." He was a captain in the "Fifth regulars" in June 1814, and then he was appointed aide-de-camp to Gen. Jackson. The journal of captain Isaac Baker notes on July 29, 1814, "Colo A.P.Hayne Inspect. Genl to Genl. Jacks & the gen's aid Capt. Butler passed me this morning," near Fort Deposit.

He was at the signing of the treaty of Fort Jackson with the Muscogee, and was at the capture of Pensacola in November 1814. On January 8, 1815, when the battle of New Orleans was fought, "he was left in charge of the city". He reportedly "ever retained the warm personal friendship and confidence of General Jackson." In Jackson's official statement about the battle, he wrote, "I was deprived of the services of one of my aids Capt. Butler, whom I was obliged to station, to his great regret, in town." After the battle he and his brother William O. Butler were breveted major, and his first cousin Robert Butler was breveted lieutenant colonel. Thomas L. Butler resigned as Jackson's aide-de-camp and was replaced by his younger brother W. O. Butler. After he resigned his commission in the army, he was appointed surveyor and inspector of the port of New Orleans by president James Madison, serving briefly. He then resigned that post and returned to his home at Port William. In 1817 he was one of the deputy surveyors hired by John Coffee to survey newly ceded land in the vicinity of the Muscle Shoals of northern Alabama. According to Clarence E. Carter, editor of The Territorial Papers of the United States, Thomas L. Butler was one of a number of men who were irregularly hired to survey tracts along the Tennessee River:

"There are no surveying contracts extant for Alabama Territory which supply data on the specific tract or tracts to be surveyed, nor the time within which the work should be completed as in the case, for example, of Michigan Territory. Cf. Terr. Papers (Mich.), X, 527–530. Apparently the surveyors operated under informal instructions from the surveyor general. As for Freeman's district, in southern Alabama, no contracts of any kind have been uncovered. A comparison of the above form with all others issued and signed by Coffee for the years 1817 to 1819 inclusive discloses no textual deviations."

He was sheriff of Gallatin County, Kentucky from 1819 to 1825. He represented Gallatin County in 1826 in the Kentucky state legislature. He again represented Carroll and Gallatin counties the legislature in 1847–1848. He was associated with the Democratic Party.

He built what is known as the Butler–Turpin House in Carrollton, Kentucky, in 1859. The house is preserved as part of General Butler State Resort Park.

He died at age 91 in Louisville, Kentucky. He was buried at the Butler Family Cemetery along with his father Percival Butler and his brother William O. Butler.

== Personal life ==
In January 1811, he married his cousin Sarah Hawkins, "daughter of the eccentric Martin Hawkins, of Fayette". They had three children, all of whom pre-deceased him. His daughter Mary Ellen Butler married Philip Osbourne Turpin and had issue but she died of tuberculosis. Turpin was a farmer and also a Kentucky state legislator. Butler lived in old age with his son-in-law and grandchildren.

== Sources ==
- Arrowood, C. F.; Baker, Isaac L. (April 1927). "The Journal of Captain Isaac L. Baker". The Southwestern Historical Quarterly. 30 (4): 272–282. ISSN 0038-478X.
- Carter, Clarence Edwin, ed. (1952). The Territorial Papers of the United States, Volume XVIII: The Territory of Alabama, 1817–1819. National Archives and Records Administration. Washington, D.C.: U.S. Government Printing Office. LCCN 35026191. OCLC 1157716. OL 8078771W. Publication No. 11-52.
- James, Marquis (1933). Andrew Jackson: The Border Captain. Bobbs-Merrill.
- Roberts, Frances C.; Reidy, Thomas E. (2019) [1956]. The Founding of Alabama: Background and Formative Period in the Great Bend and Madison County. Tuscaloosa: The University of Alabama Press. ISBN 978-0-8173-2043-0. LCCN 2019018459. OCLC 1133266247. Project MUSE book 72323.
