= Carrollton =

Carrollton is the name of some places in the United States of America:

- Carrollton, Alabama
- Carrollton, Arkansas
- Carrollton, Georgia
- Carrollton, Illinois
- Carrollton, Carroll County, Indiana
- Carrollton, Hancock County, Indiana
- Carrollton, Kentucky
- Carrollton, Maryland, a former town now in the city of Baltimore
- Carrollton Manor, a tract of land in Frederick County, Maryland, from which a signer of the U.S. Declaration of Independence, Charles Carroll of Carrollton, took his name
- Carrollton Viaduct, the first stone masonry bridge for railroad use in the United States, was built for the Baltimore and Ohio Railroad in 1829.
- Carrollton, Mississippi
- Carrollton, Missouri
- Carrollton, New Orleans, a former town now in the city New Orleans, Louisiana
- Carrollton, New York
- Carrollton, Ohio
- Carrollton, Texas, the largest city of this name in the United States
- Carrollton, Virginia
- New Carrollton, Maryland

== Other ==
- Carrollton, Kentucky bus collision
- Carrollton School of the Sacred Heart, an independent Catholic girls' school in Miami, Florida
- Carrollton (band)
- Carrollton (name)
- "Carrollton" (song), a song by Suicideboys

== See also ==
- Carroll (disambiguation), various places
- Carrolltown, Pennsylvania
- Carrollton Historic District (disambiguation)
- Carrollton Township (disambiguation)
- Carrolton Township, Fillmore County, Minnesota
