= Alexander Beaton =

Alexander Beaton may refer to:

- Alex Beaton (1944–2022), Scottish musician and singer
- Frank Beaton (born Alexander Beaton, 1953), Canadian ice hockey player

== See also ==
- Alexandra Beaton (born 1994), Canadian actress
