= Carroll High School =

Carroll High School can refer to:

== In the United States ==
- Carroll High School (Alabama), Ozark, Alabama
- Carroll High School (Flora, Indiana), Flora, Indiana
- Carroll High School (Fort Wayne, Indiana), Fort Wayne, Indiana
- Carroll High School (Iowa), Carroll, Iowa
- Carroll County High School (Kentucky), Carrollton, Kentucky
- Carroll High School (Monroe, Louisiana), Monroe, Louisiana
- Carroll High School (Dayton, Ohio), Dayton, Ohio
- Archbishop John Carroll High School, Radnor, Pennsylvania
- Mary Carroll High School, Corpus Christi, Texas
- Carroll Senior High School, Southlake, Texas
- Carroll County High School (Virginia), Hillsville, Virginia
- Archbishop Carroll High School (Washington, D.C.), Washington, D.C.

== In Liberia ==
- Carroll High School (Yekepa), Yekepa, Nimba County
