= Glasgow Highland Games =

Cultural event in Kentucky, United States

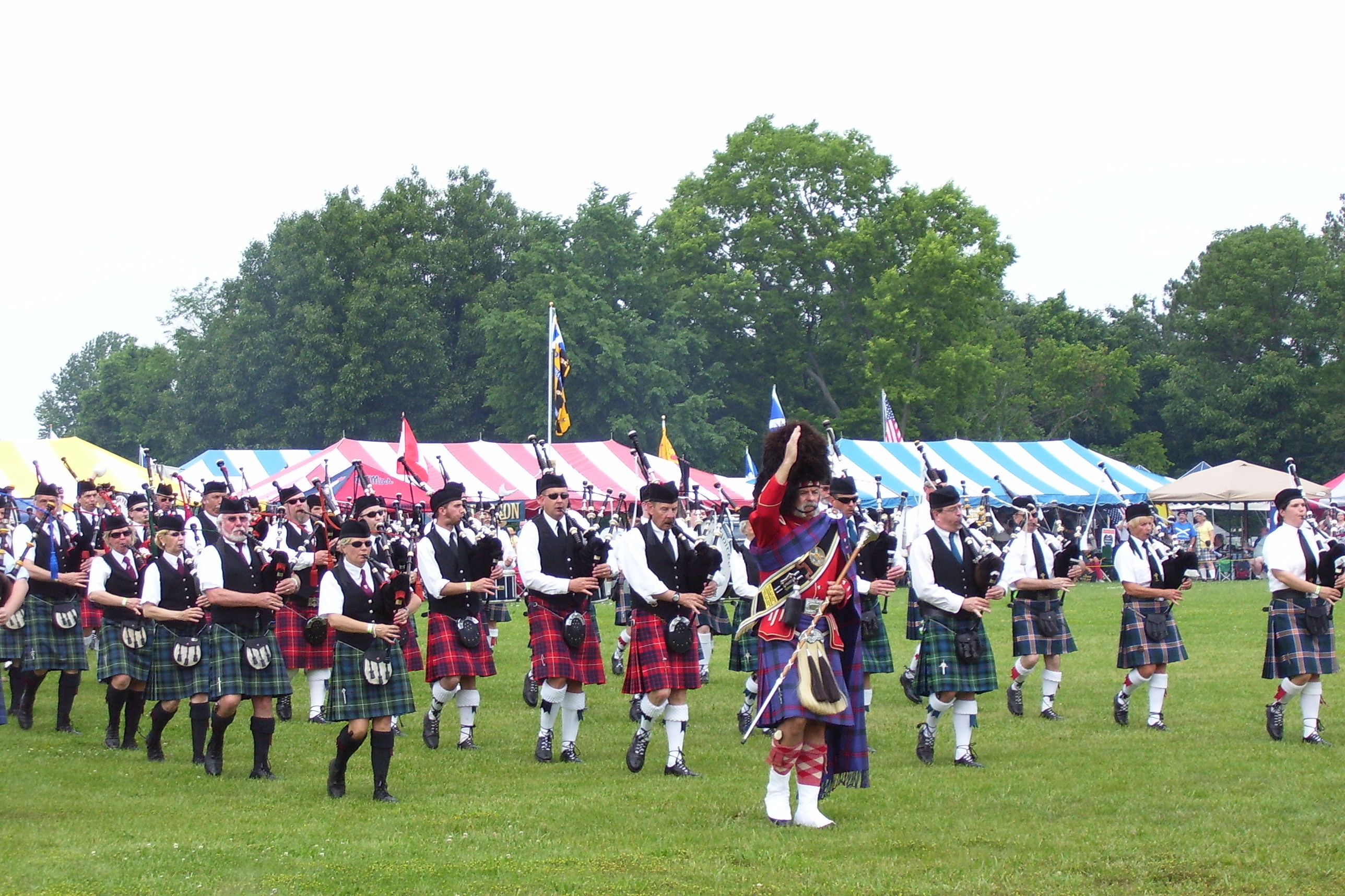
Drum Major Greg Cutcliff leading the massed bands at the opening ceremony of the 2008 Glasgow Highland Games

The Glasgow Highland Games are a regional Highland games and Scottish heritage celebration held annually in and near Glasgow, Kentucky. The main festival grounds are located at Barren River Lake State Resort Park, about 13 miles (21 km) from Glasgow, while most other events are held in the city proper.

Glasgow is named for Glasgow, Scotland, the country's largest city, and the area was originally settled by Scots-Irish immigrants. The area has long celebrated its Scottish heritage in many ways, most notably with the "Scotties" athletic teams of Glasgow High School and its Glasgow Scottie Band, which has long marched in full Scottish regalia with bagpipes. But a full-fledged formal celebration of all things Scottish did not take place until 1986, when the first Glasgow Highland Games was held.

Since that time, the event has expanded greatly to include the traditional highland games in professional and amateur competitions, a Ceilidh, bagpipe and highland dancing contests, parades, displays by dozens of Scottish clans, vendors of Scottish merchandise, and much more. The festival grounds has expanded to include two separate competition fields.

The games are held on the weekend following Memorial Day each year, except 2020-21 when they were cancelled due to COVID-19.

Other highland games held each year in Kentucky include the Kentucky Scottish Weekend in Carrollton and the Western Kentucky Highland Festival in Murray.
