= Rory McEwen (artist) =

Scottish artist and musician (1932–1982)

- Born: 12 March 1932
- Died: 16 October 1982 (aged 50)
- Education: Eton College; Trinity College, Cambridge
- Occupations: Artist, musician
- Spouse: Romana von Hofmannsthal (m. 1958)
- Children: 4
- Parent(s): Sir John McEwen, 1st Baronet; Brigid Mary Lindley
- Relatives: Mary McEwen (sister); Sir Francis Lindley (grandfather)

Roderick McEwen (12 March 1932 – 16 October 1982), known as Rory McEwen, was a Scottish artist and musician.

== Early life and education ==
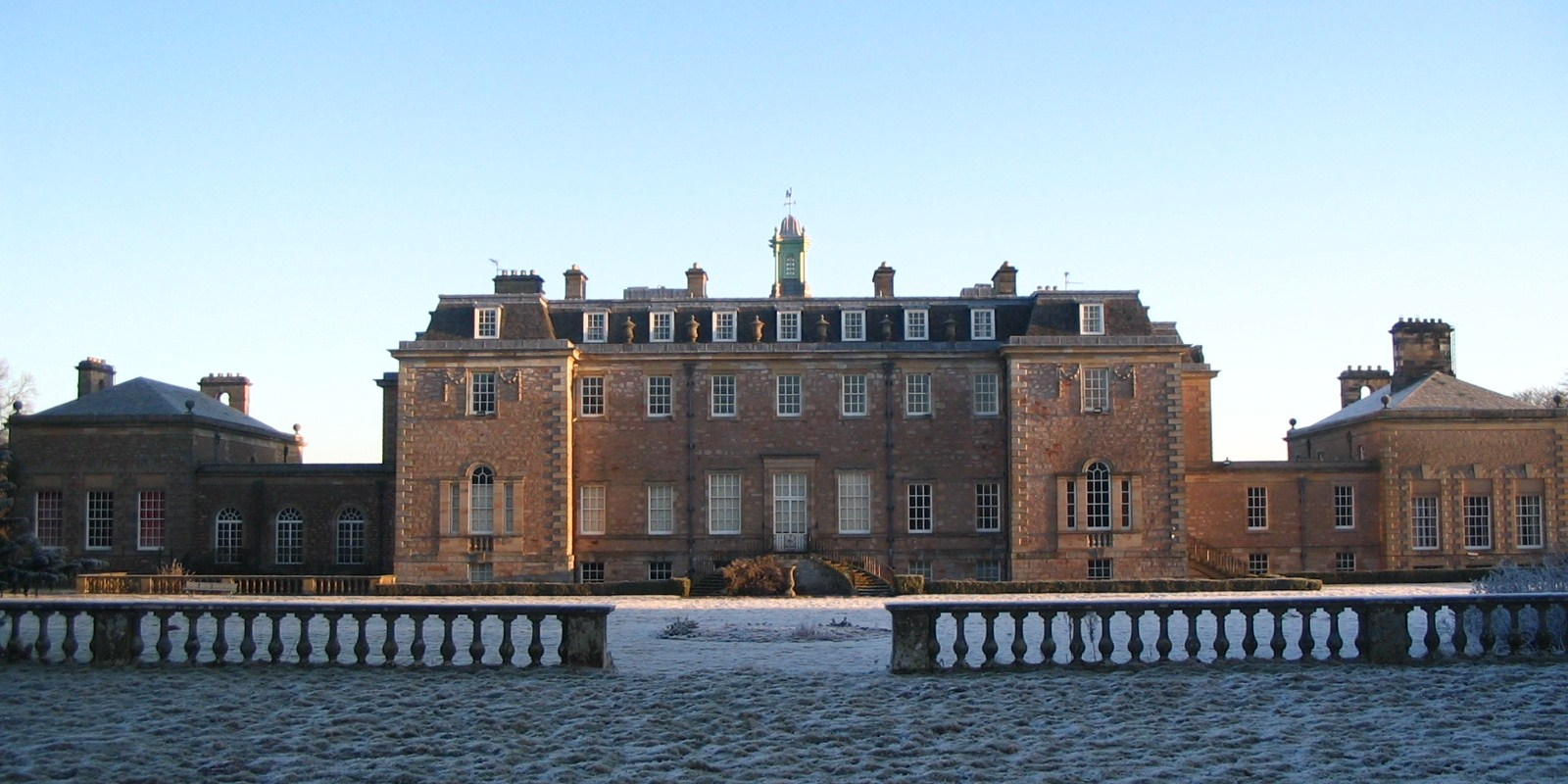
Marchmont House, the McEwen family home

He was the fourth of seven children born to Sir John McEwen, 1st Baronet, and his wife, Brigid Mary Lindley. She was the daughter of Sir Francis Oswald Lindley and great-granddaughter of botanist and illustrator John Lindley, who in 1840 was instrumental in saving the Royal Botanic Gardens at Kew from destruction.

McEwen was educated at the family home, Marchmont House in the Scottish Borders, by a French governess named Mademoiselle Philippe, and at Eton College, where he was taught by Wilfred Blunt, who described him as "perhaps the most gifted artist to pass through my hands". After his National Service in The Queen's Own Cameron Highlanders, he gained a degree in English at Trinity College, Cambridge, where he became friends with Karl Miller, Dudley Moore, Peter Cook, Jonathan Miller and Mark Boxer, among others.

== Career ==
In 1955, he wrote and performed in Between the Lines at the 1955 Cambridge Footlights Revue production at the Scala Theatre in London.

In 1956, he travelled with his younger brother Alexander on the Cunarder Ascania to New York in search of Lead Belly's widow, Martha. When they found her, she was so impressed by their understanding of, and skill at, playing her late husband's music, that she allowed Rory to play Lead Belly's custom-made 12-string Stella guitar, inspiring him to set off to find his own. The brothers played their way across America, cutting Scottish Songs and Ballads for Smithsonian Folkways Records and appearing on the coast-to-coast Ed Sullivan Show on CBS, twice, before returning home to Britain.

By 1957, McEwen had become one of the leading lights in the post-war folksong revival. He was a regular on the daily BBC Tonight TV programme presented by Cliff Michelmore, writing and performing topical calypsos, whilst also working as the art director for The Spectator magazine.

During the early 1960s, Rory and Alex hosted their own live shows to sell-out audiences at three successive Edinburgh Festivals. George Melly, the Clancy Brothers, Dave Swarbrick (later of Fairport Convention), Bob Davenport and the Americans Dick Farina and Carolyn Hester were among their guests.

In 1963 and 1964, McEwen presented and performed on the folk and blues music programme Hullabaloo for commercial ATV television.

Among his closest artist friends were Jim Dine, Brice Marden, Cy Twombly, Robert Graham, Kenneth Armitage, Derek Boshier and David Novros. Among close poet friends were the Portuguese Alberto de Lacerda and the Americans Kenneth Koch and Ron Padgett. It was typical of Rory McEwen's Scottish internationalism and versatility that, as an offshoot of his admiration for Indian music, George Harrison took sitar lessons from Ravi Shankar in his house, and that he visited Bhutan in the last days before tourism.

=== Painting ===
From 1964, McEwen decided to devote himself entirely to his career in visual art, his floral interest also finding expression in colour-refracting perspex sculpture and large abstract works in glass and steel using perspex. In painting he forged his own interpretation of international minimalism, creating works in watercolour on velum, of flowers, leaves and vegetables.

His work is in the British Museum, V&A, Tate Gallery, Scottish National Gallery of Modern Art, Hunt Institute, Pittsburgh and MOMA, New York, among other collections. A previously unknown painting by McEwen of Fritillaria gibbosa was purchased by the Royal Horticultural Society in 2018.

== Personal life ==
On 15 April 1958, McEwen married debutante Romana von Hofmannsthal (d. 2014), a graduate of Sarah Lawrence College. She was the daughter of Raimund von Hofmannsthal and Ava Alice Astor. Her grandparents were Hugo von Hofmannsthal, Strauss's librettist and founder of the Salzburg Festival, and Americans Ava Lowle Willing (who later became Lady Ribblesdale) and John Jacob Astor IV, the multi-millionaire investor, inventor and writer, who drowned on the Titanic.

They had four children, including Christabel McEwen, who married Edward Lambton, 7th Earl of Durham. They divorced in 1995, and in 2005, she married the musician Jools Holland.

In the summer of 1982, McEwen was diagnosed with terminal cancer. On 16 October, suffering and in a state of despair, he threw himself under a train at South Kensington tube station. He was 50.

== Publications ==
- Tulips and Tulipomania, with Wilfred Blunt
- Old Carnations and Pinks with Oscar C. Moreton (and an introduction by Sacheverell Sitwell)
- The Auricula, Its History and Character with Oscar C. Moreton
- From the Air with Kenneth Koch
- Rory McEwen The Colours of Reality edited by Martyn Rix

== Exhibitions ==
- 1962: Durlacher Bros., New York
- 1964:

Andre Weill Gallery, Paris
The Hunt Botanical Library, Pittsburgh
National Assembly Rooms, Edinburgh
Gateway Theatre, Edinburgh

- 1965: Durlacher Bros., New York
- 1966: Douglas and Foulis, Edinburgh
- 1967:

Richard Demarco Gallery, Edinburgh
Byron Gallery, New York

- 1968:

Richard Demarco Gallery, Edinburgh
Kunsthalle, Düsseldorf

- 1969: Richard Demarco Gallery, Edinburgh
- 1970: Richard Demarco Gallery, Edinburgh
- 1971: Scottish Arts Council
- 1972:

Redfern Gallery, London
Sonnabend Gallery, New York

- 1974:

Redfern Gallery, London
Tooth's Gallery, London

- 1975: Oxford Gallery, Oxford
- 1976: Redfern Gallery, London
- 1977: Oxford Gallery, Oxford
- 1978: ICA, London
- 1979: Taranman Gallery, London
- 1980: Nihonbash Gallery, Tokyo
- 1981:

Redfern Gallery, London
Fischer Fine Art. London

- 1982:

Steampfli Gallery, New York
Wave Hill, New York

- 1983: Hunt Institute, Pittsburgh
- 1984: Museum of Modern Art, New York
- 1988: Royal Botanical Gardens Edinburgh, and the Serpentine Gallery, London
- 2013: Shirley Sherwood Gallery of Botanical Art at Kew Gardens, London
- 2024: Gibbes Museum of Art - Charleston, South Carolina
- 2024: Davis Museum - Boston, Massachusetts
- 2025: Society of the Four Arts - Palm Beach
- 2025: Driehaus Museum, Chicago
- 2025: Nature's Song, Garden Museum, London

== Discography ==
- Rory and Alex McEwen, Great Scottish Ballads, Folkways Records, 10" LP, 1956
- Rory and Alex McEwen, Scottish Songs and Ballads, Folkways Records, 10" LP, 1957
- Rory and Alex McEwen and Isla Cameron, Folksong Jubilee, His Master's Voice, 12" LP, 1958
- Rory McEwen, Edinburgh - Its Sounds And People, His Master's Voice, 7" EP, 1959
- Rory And Alex McEwen, Hootenannie 1, Waverly Records, 7" EP, 1963
- Rory And Alex McEwen, Hootenannie 2, Waverly Records, 7" EP, 1963
- Rory And Alex McEwen, Hootenannie 3, Waverly Records, 7" EP, 1963
- Rory And Alex McEwen, Hootenannie 4, Waverly Records, 7" EP, 1963
- Rory and Alex McEwen, and Carolyne and Dick Farina, Four For Fun, Waverly Records, 7" EP, 1963
- Rory McEwen and Jim Dine, Songs, Poems and Prints, Museum of Modern Art, New York, 12" LP, 1969
