= Carroll County Public Schools =

Carroll County Public Schools may refer to:

- Carroll County Public Schools (Kentucky)
- Carroll County Public Schools (Maryland)
- Carroll County Public Schools (Virginia), see List of school divisions in Virginia § C
- Carroll County School District (Georgia)
- Carroll County School District (Mississippi)
