= Henry Ogburn House =

- U.S. National Register of Historic Places
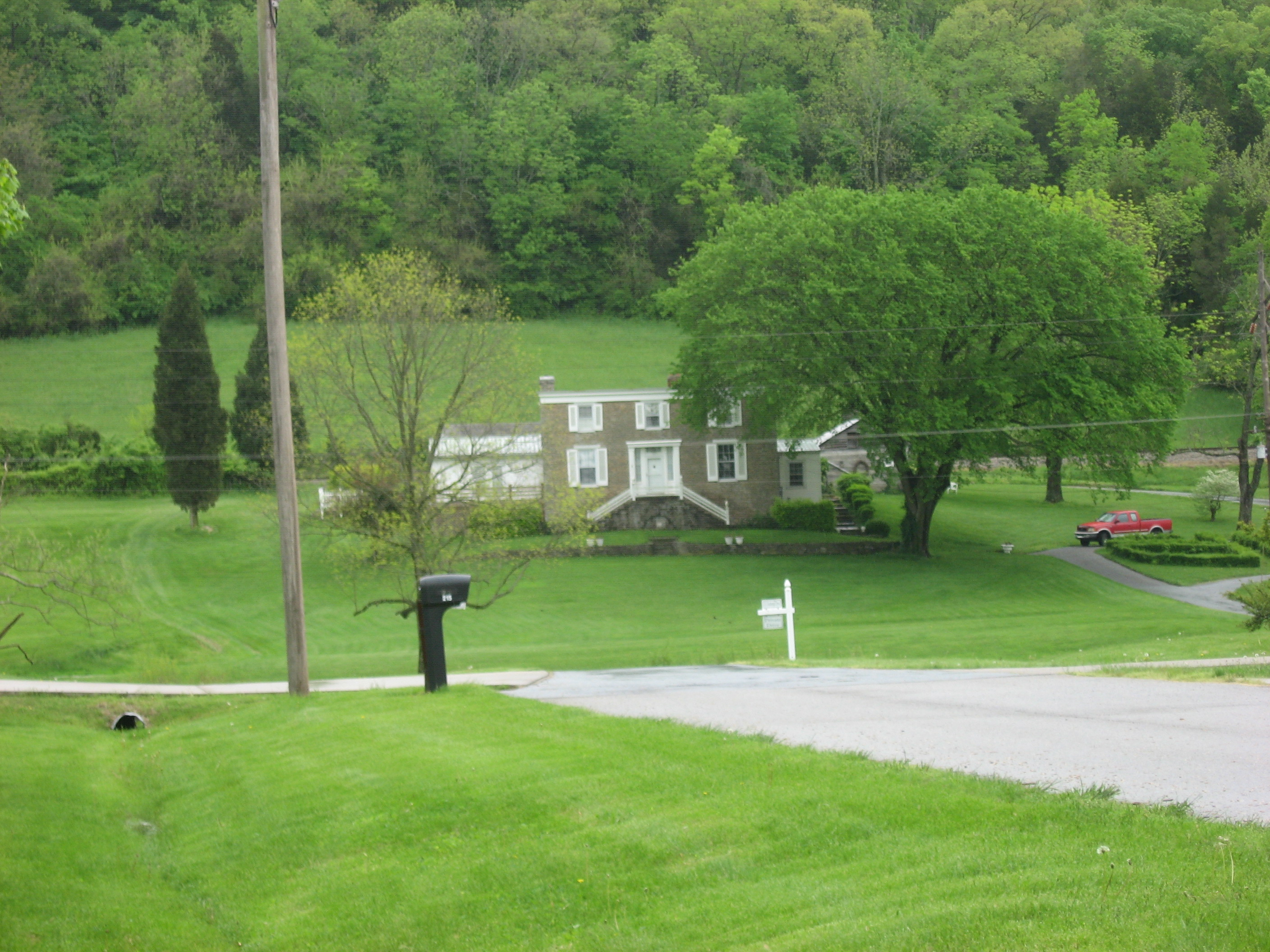

- Location within Kentucky Location within the United States
- Location: U.S. Route 42, Carrollton, Kentucky
- Coordinates: 38°41′29″N 85°07′57″W
- Area: 20 acres (8.1 ha)
- Built: 1845
- Architectural style: Greek Revival
- MPS: Early Stone Buildings of Kentucky Outer Bluegrass and Pennyrile TR
- NRHP reference No.: 87000149
- Added to NRHP: January 8, 1987

The Henry Ogburn House, located about 1,400 feet (430 m) off U.S. Route 42 in Carrollton, Kentucky, was built in 1845. It was listed on the National Register of Historic Places in 1987.

It is a three-bay two-story central passage plan dry stone house, with Greek Revival style.

The listing included a second contributing building, a two-room log "quarters" building
