= Alex Beaton =

Scottish musician and singer (1944–2022)

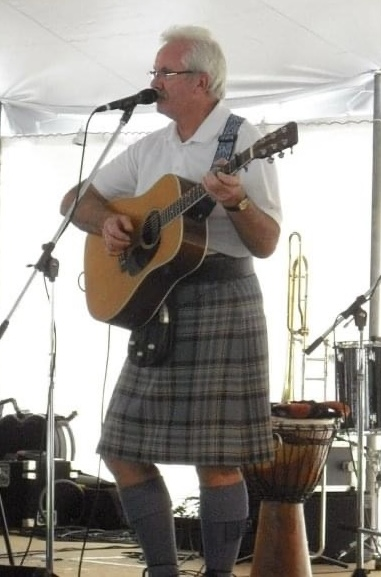
- Alex Beaton at the 2009 Kentucky Scottish Weekend

Background information
- Born: 15 July 1944; Glasgow, Scotland
- Died: 27 May 2022 (aged 77) St. Peters, Missouri, U.S.
- Occupations: Singer, songwriter, musician, tour host
- Instruments: Guitar, harmonica
- Formerly of: The Cumberland Three
- Spouse: Linda Irvin Beaton
- Website: www.alexbeaton.com
- Military service
- Branch: United States Army
- Service years: 1966-1969

Alexander William MacLeod Beaton (15 July 1944 – 27 May 2022) was a Scottish folk singer and guitarist. He performed across the United States and in Canada, hosted tours to Scotland, and established folk singers as a regular feature at highland games in the United States, beginning with the Grandfather Mountain Highland Games in North Carolina.

Beaton released 21 albums on CD and one DVD musical travelogue of Scotland that combined three titles that were previously released on VHS tape. Artists featured on his recordings included Alasdair Fraser and Eric Rigler.

== Origins and early work ==
Alexander William MacLeod Beaton was born on 15 July 1944, in Glasgow, Scotland, to an Irish mother and Scottish father. He began his musical career at the age of 17 as a member of The Cumberland Three, a British folk group in the early 1960s. The Cumberland Three consisted of Beaton, Brian Fogarty, and Leonard Sturrock, with Pete Sayers on the banjo. In 1963 they appeared at a large folk music concert with Robin Hall and Jimmie Macgregor. The group made appearances on radio and television, including on the BBC and ITV television networks. On 7 December 1963, the group performed on the British TV series Hullabaloo. The group recorded for Parlophone Records. In 1964 they released their one and only album Introducing The Cumberland Three. In 1965 The Cumberland Three disbanded in connection with the end of the folk music revival.

Beaton emigrated to the United States in 1965 where he initially lived in New York state and worked as a singer on TV and in restaurants. For a time he was the head of the entertainment department at Cunning Hartmann and Associates in Troy, New York. Later serving in the US Army, he entertained troops in the Third Army Soldiers' Show and the Seventh US Army Chorus in Germany. After serving 4 years in the army he took up the nightclub scene in 1969. During the 1970s, he re-directed his career toward writing and performing American country music, later winning an accolade at the International American Song Festival Awards in 1974 for a country song. Also in 1974, he moved to the Los Angeles area.

== Career as a Scottish folk singer ==
By 1981 Beaton was a resident singer at the Bob Burns Restaurant in Woodland Hills, California, performing a variety of music including country, folk, pop, rock, and standards. In 1983 he was "getting burned out" and, at the suggestion of a friend, started focusing more on traditional Scottish music. While at Bob Burns, wealthy real estate broker James Gary, who was of Scottish descent, became a fan of Beaton's and invested in an album of Scottish music; this resulted in the two becoming business partners to form Glenfinnan Records (Glenfinnan is the place name of where the Jacobite rising of 1745 began). In 1986 Beaton fully transitioned to performing folk music that was primarily Scottish in origin or subject, although his repertoire included songs in the folk music genre that were not purely Scottish (such as by Gordon Lightfoot and Stan Rogers).

Beaton "tried for three years in the early '80s to perform at the prestigious Grandfather Mountain Games in North Carolina, with no success." Determined to make a breakthrough, he traveled to Linville, North Carolina and busked on a street corner on the route to the games. By the next year, Beaton was singing at the games and emceed the Tartan Ball. Following that success, he promoted and advertised himself and pushed his way into other games. "Now, every Highland Games has folk music," Beaton told the Albuquerque Journal in 2000, whereas previously they "never included singers, only bagpipe bands."

By 1990, Beaton had "won acclaim as the featured performer at numerous Highland Games and Scottish cultural events throughout the U.S. and Canada". In 1993 it was reported that Beaton was appearing at several dozen festivals that year. Also in 1993, it was stated that Beaton was "the featured performer at all of the major Scottish festivals, including Maxville and Fergus Highland Games in Canada, North Carolina's Grandfather Mountain, California's Santa Rosa and Cost Mesa, and the Stone Mountain Highland Games in Atlanta, Georgia." In 1994 it was said that he gave about 75 performances a year, mostly at Scottish festivals. In 1996 he started hosting guided tours to Scotland. In 1999, he was described as "among the best-known Scottish entertainers" in the United States.

The Times Scotland noted Beaton's performance style, stating "mixed in with the tender ballads from his homeland were bawdy family favorites such as "You Cannae Shove yer Granny aff a Bus" and a healthy dose of Glaswegian banter." The Herald Scotland described him as "a tall, distinctive figure with . . . (an) easy-on-the-ear singing style." He had a baritone vocal range. The Virginia Gazette said "Beaton's voice and guitar are clear, thoughtful and sensitive. Singing sentimental ballads, his rich (singing voice) evokes a tear; his sly Scot's humor provokes laughter; rousing interpretations of patriotic songs invite enthusiastic cheers." He interspersed narratives of Scottish history and wit amongst songs in his musical sets.

Beaton gave what would become his last public performance on the Isle of Harris on 11 June 2011. He performed Piper to the End by Mark Knopfler, which he was planning to include on his next album.

== Guitars ==
Beaton's stage guitar was a Tony Rice model made by the Santa Cruz Guitar Company, located in Santa Cruz, California. The model is based on Tony Rice's 1935 Martin D-28, formerly owned by Clarence White. Beaton's guitar was fashioned of Brazilian rosewood (back, sides, and neck), old growth German spruce (top), and ebony wood (fret board). He used a Sunrise sound hole pickup. The guitar was completed in June 1988 and was purchased by Beaton in August 1988 from a music store in Carmel, California. Beaton also used two Martin guitars.

== Honors ==
In 2012, the "Alex Beaton stage" was dedicated at the Scottish Fest at the OC Fair & Event Center (Costa Mesa, California). There is also a stage named for Beaton at the Grandfather Mountain Highland Games. In July 2012, Beaton received the Agnes McCrae Morton Award from the Grandfather Mountain Highland Games. In 2022 it was reported that Mark Knopfler (of Dire Straits fame) was a fan of Beaton's. The Virginia Scottish Games features the "Beaton Entertainment Tent" as of 2022.

== Illness and death ==
In 2011 Beaton was paralyzed from the neck down due to an accident at home. Two years after his accident, he and his wife, Linda, moved to St. Peters, Missouri, to be nearer to family.

Beaton died at his home on 27 May 2022, with his wife, Linda, by his side. He was also survived by two daughters, Alessandra (Ali) and Catriona (Catie); a brother, Neil; a stepson, John; a granddaughter, Maggie; three nieces; one nephew; two grandnieces; and three grandnephews.

== Discography ==
Beaton co-founded his own record label, Glenfinnan Music Ltd., with a business partner. He released 22 albums under this label:

1. Alex Beaton Sings of Scotland Forever (1984)
2. Alex Beaton Sings of Scotland Forever (1984)
3. Los Angeles Police Pipe Band, Featuring Vocals, Alex Beaton (1984)
4. Daft Ditties, A Collection of Humorous and Tastefully Offensive Songs (1987)
5. On the Beaton Path (1987)
6. The Road to the Isles (1990)
7. Halfway Home (1992)
8. Alex Beaton's Christmas Classics (1994)
9. Beaton's Best (1994)
10. In The Scottish Tradition (1994)
11. Songs of Praise, Pipes of Peace (1994)
12. The Water is Wide (1995), featuring a version of Dougie MacLean's "Caledonia"
13. The Scotsman (1996), featuring "Pipes in the Glen," a song written by Beaton and Ron Eisenberg
14. A Dream of Arran (1998)
15. Kidding Around (1999)
16. I Have Seen the Highlands (2000)
17. Over the Border (2001), featuring "Northwest Passage" written by Stan Rogers
18. Lover's Heart (2004)
19. Beaton's Personal Favorites (2005), featuring a version of Dougie MacLean's "Caledonia" and "Pipes in the Glen," a song written by Beaton and Ron Eisenberg
20. The Songs of Robert Burns (2007)
21. From the Sea to the Shore (2010), featuring "Sailing to Philadelphia" written by Mark Knopfler and "Christian Island" written by Gordon Lightfoot
22. Live in Concert, Alex Beaton, Alasdair Fraser, & Eric Rigler (2012), featuring "The Mary Ellen Carter" written by Stan Rogers, and "Pipes in the Glen," a song written by Beaton and Ron Eisenberg

In March 2023, two of Beaton's early albums (that were previously released on vinyl) were re-released posthumously on CD and for download:

1. Live at the Sawmill (1975), featuring folk and Scottish songs
2. Seasons (early 1980s), featuring country and Scottish folk songs and including two songs that Beaton co-wrote, "Seasons Come, Seasons Go" and "I'd Rather Live Alone with Me"

== Filmography ==
Alex Beaton's Scotland, A Musical Travelogue of Scotland in Three Films (2005), is a DVD containing three films previously released on VHS tape:

- Going Home (1989) - Beaton visits Bannockburn, Culloden, Glen Coe, Glenfinnan, Loch Lomond, the Isle of Skye, and Stirling Castle
- I Belong to Glasgow (1990) - Beaton visits Glasgow and the River Clyde
- On The Castle Trail (1994) - Beaton visits castles such as Caerlaverock, Dunnottar, Dunstaffnage, Edinburgh, Eilean Donan, and Glamis
