= Carrollton (name) =

Carrollton or Carrolton is a name commonly associated with places that can also serve as a given name. People who are known by names that include Carrollton or Carrolton include the following:

- Charles Carrolton "Chick" Fraser (1873–1940), American baseball player
- Rufus Carrollton Harris (1896–1988), American university president
- Charles Carroll of Carrollton (1737–1832), Irish-American politician and patriot

== See also ==
- Carrollton (disambiguation)
