= Gen. William O. Butler House =

- U.S. National Register of Historic Places
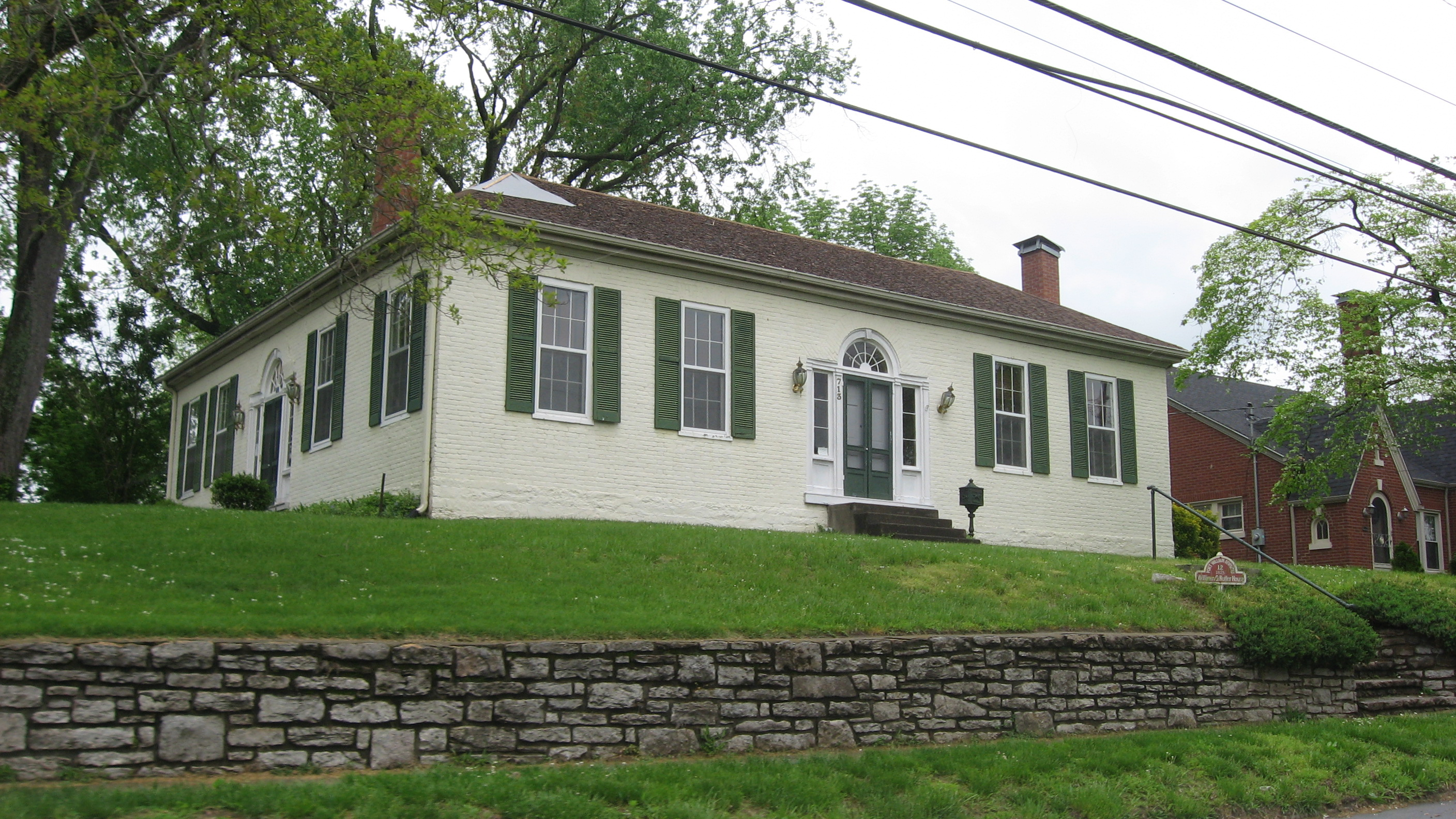

- Location within Kentucky Location within the United States
- Location: Highland Ave., Carrollton, Kentucky
- Coordinates: 38°40′54″N 85°10′31″W
- Area: 5 acres (2.0 ha)
- Built: c.1819
- Built by: Mr. Smith
- Architectural style: Federal
- NRHP reference No.: 76000861
- Added to NRHP: May 28, 1976

The Gen. William O. Butler House, on Highland Ave. in Carrollton, Kentucky, was built c.1819.

It was home of William O. Butler (1791–1880), who was a veteran of the War of 1812, and later as a Major General in the 1846–1848 Mexican–American War. It was built after his marriage in 1817.

The house is interesting for having two identical main facades. It was built of brick, with brick on south and west fronts laid in Flemish bond "with the queen closers at the corners." It was originally U-shaped but a roof later closed it in.
