= Hullabaloo (British TV series) =

- Rory McEwen performs over the opening credits for the series
- Genre: Music
- Directed by: Ben Churchill
- Presented by: Rory McEwen
- Country of origin: United Kingdom
- Original language: English
- No. of seasons: 1
- No. of episodes: 13

Production
- Running time: 22–24 minutes

Original release
- Network: ABC Weekend TV
- Release: 28 September 1963 – 4 January 1964

Hullabaloo is an English music television series that aired weekly on ABC Weekend TV in the UK Midlands region from September 1963 to January 1964. Compered by Rory McEwen, it showcased a selection of prominent (and some less prominent) UK folk and blues musicians in front of a live audience, and also included a number of visiting international artists. Almost forgotten for over 40 years since its original broadcast, all 13 original shows were re-released on DVD in 2020 and provide a rare documentation on film of a significant proportion of the British folk (and some blues) scene of that era.

== Overview of content ==
Hullabaloo was compered by Scottish musician and visual artist Rory McEwen who performed the introductory music, and sometimes additional songs, in each episode. In its 13, almost half hour episodes, it featured many of the most notable UK folk and blues music artists of the day including Martin Carthy, Cyril Davies, the Clancy Brothers, Isla Cameron, Sydney Carter, Tommy Makem, the Spinners (the English group), Long John Baldry, Davey Graham, the Ian Campbell Folk Group including a young Dave Swarbrick, Bob Davenport, Cyril Tawney, Rory's brother Alex McEwen, Dominic Behan, Nadia Cattouse plus some others, and also featured international visiting performers including Carolyn Hester, Peter, Paul and Mary, Sonny Boy Williamson II, Ramblin' Jack Elliott, Bill Clifton and Esther & Abi Ofarim (the latter as "The Duo Ofarim"). The series was designed to capitalise on the emerging American folk music revival, with its proponents noting that by 1963 the U.S. Newport Folk Festival was attracting many thousands more attendees than the equivalent Jazz Festival held the same year. The shows were recorded live in front of invited audiences at ABC's Teddington Studios.

According to "TV Pop Diaries", the show was preceded by a live music concert given by many of the performers at the (presumably 1963) Edinburgh Festival entitled "Straight From The Wood", and also had a post-series concert at the Royal Festival Hall in May 1964, despite the series never being originally shown in London, necessary arrangements being unable to be reached between the regional and national TV networks. The show was, however, syndicated to be shown in both Australia and America, from which small performance clips emerged intermittently over the years.

In addition to the more widely known performers as listed above, the series also included performances by (today) less remembered artists including the Manhattan Brothers, Lisa Turner, Shirley Bland, Jill Freedman (later to find fame as a documentary photographer), Linda Drew, Judith Silver, Maureen Scott, the Malcolm Price Trio, the Cumberland Three (featuring a young Alex Beaton), the Haverim, Pete McGurk and Jean Hart; space was even found for a couple of fingerstyle guitar instrumentals by the little known, but talented Caribbean jazz guitarist Fitzroy Coleman who was a sometime frequenter of the London folk scene of the day and had recorded with Ewan MacColl among others.

== Episodes ==
Air date	Artists
28 September 1963	Rory McEwen, Cyril Davies and His Rhythm and Blues All Stars, Alex McEwen, Carolyn Hester, The Clancy Brothers & Tommy Makem, Carolyn Hester
5 October 1963	Rory McEwen, Cyril Davies and His Rhythm and Blues All Stars, Rory and Alex McEwen, Davy Graham, Carolyn Hester, The Manhattan Brothers, Rory and Alex McEwen, Sydney Carter
19 October 1963	Rory McEwen, Rory and Alex McEwen, Carolyn Hester, Peter, Paul & Mary, Ramblin' Jack Elliott, Cyril Davies and His Rhythm and Blues All Stars, Sydney Carter
26 October 1963	Rory McEwen, Martin Carthy, Lisa Turner and Rory McEwen, Shirley Bland and Davy Graham, The Ian Campbell Folk Group, Cyril Davies and His Rhythm and Blues All Stars, Martin Carthy
2 November 1963	Rory McEwen, Jill Freedman and Shirley Bland, Cyril Davies and His Rhythm and Blues All Stars, Davy Graham, Rory McEwen, Long John Baldry and Davy Graham, Jill Freedman, Shirley Bland and Davy Graham, Dominic Behan
9 November 1963	Rory McEwen, Cyril Davies and His Rhythm and Blues All Stars, Peter, Paul & Mary, Sydney Carter, Carolyn Hester, Rory and Alex McEwen, Ramblin' Jack Elliott, Peter, Paul & Mary
16 November 1963	Martin Carthy, Linda Drew, Rory McEwen and Cyril Davies, Cyril Davies and His Rhythm and Blues All Stars, Rory McEwen, Judith Silver, Rory McEwen, Long John Baldry and Cyril Davies, Maureen Scott
23 November 1963	Rory McEwen, Martin Carthy, Cyril Davies and His Rhythm and Blues All Stars, Jill Freedman, The Malcolm Price Trio
30 November 1963	Rory McEwen, Martin Carthy, Lisa Turner, Rory McEwen and Pete McGurk, Nadia Cattouse and Davy Graham, The Malcolm Price Trio, The Ian Campbell Folk Group, Sydney Carter
7 December 1963	Rory McEwen, The Cumberland Three, Isla Cameron and Martin Carthy, The Haverim, The Malcolm Price Trio, Bob Davenport, Rory McEwen, Martin Carthy and Bob Davenport
14 December 1963	Rory McEwen, The Spinners, Bill Clifton, Lisa Turner, Martin Carthy, Rory McEwen, Davy Graham and Pete McGurk, Fitzroy Coleman, Cyril Davies and His Rhythm and Blues All Stars, Jean Hart
21 December 1963	Rory McEwen, The Ian Campbell Folk Group, The Duo Ofarim, Johnny Dunkerley, Brian Clark and Dave Swarbrick, Rory and Alex McEwen, Sydney Carter, Sonny Boy Williamson, The Ian Campbell Folk Group and Rory and Alex McEwen
4 January 1964	Rory McEwen, Lisa Turner, Martin Carthy and Pete McGurk, Sonny Boy Williamson, The Ian Campbell Folk Group, The Duo Ofarim, Cyril Tawney, Rory McEwen and the Ian Campbell Folk Group

== Significance ==
In the event, the UK was not able to emulate the commercial success of folk and folk-related music in the way that the US was able, the latter featuring performers such as the Weavers, the Kingston Trio, Joan Baez and others including Bob Dylan and early Simon and Garfunkel, preferring instead (by the mid 1960s) the sounds of both bland "pop" music and the more beat- and (initially) "R&B" based music exemplified by the Beatles and the Rolling Stones. Recordings such as those created for Hullabaloo thus stand as a rare documentation of a formative stage in the UK's "folk revival" of the early 1960s, which persisted much more as a niche music / grass roots culture than a commercially lucrative venture for record and/or television or film companies for the succeeding decades.

== Re-release ==
After an over 40 year gap during which the original shows had effectively disappeared from public availability, all thirteen episodes were transferred from their original film format and received an official release as a 2-DVD set by Network/Studiocanal Ltd. in 2020.
