= Carroll County Courthouse =

Carroll County Courthouse or Carroll County Court House may refer to:

- Carroll County Courthouse, Eastern District, Berryville, Arkansas
- Carroll County Courthouse (Georgia), Carrollton, Georgia
- Carroll County Courthouse (Illinois), Mount Carroll, Illinois
- Carroll County Courthouse (Indiana), Delphi, Indiana
- Carroll County Courthouse (Iowa), Carroll, Iowa
- Carroll County Courthouse (Kentucky), in the Carrollton Historic District, Carrollton, Kentucky
- Carroll County Courthouse (Carrollton, Mississippi), a Mississippi Landmark
- Old Carroll County Courthouse (Vaiden, Mississippi), a Mississippi Landmark
- Carroll County Court House (Missouri), Carrollton, Missouri
- Carroll County Court House (New Hampshire), Ossipee, New Hampshire
- Carroll County Courthouse (Ohio), Carrollton, Ohio
- Carroll County Courthouse (Virginia), Hillsville, Virginia
