= Johann Koehnken =

American organ builder (1819–1897)

Johann Heinrich (John H.) Koehnken (1819–1897) was an American organ builder in Cincinnati, Ohio who worked under Matthias Schwab (1808–1862) and with Gallus Grimm (1827–1897). Their organs remain in use (with restoration work) at the Isaac M. Wise Temple (formerly Plum Street Temple) and other locations.

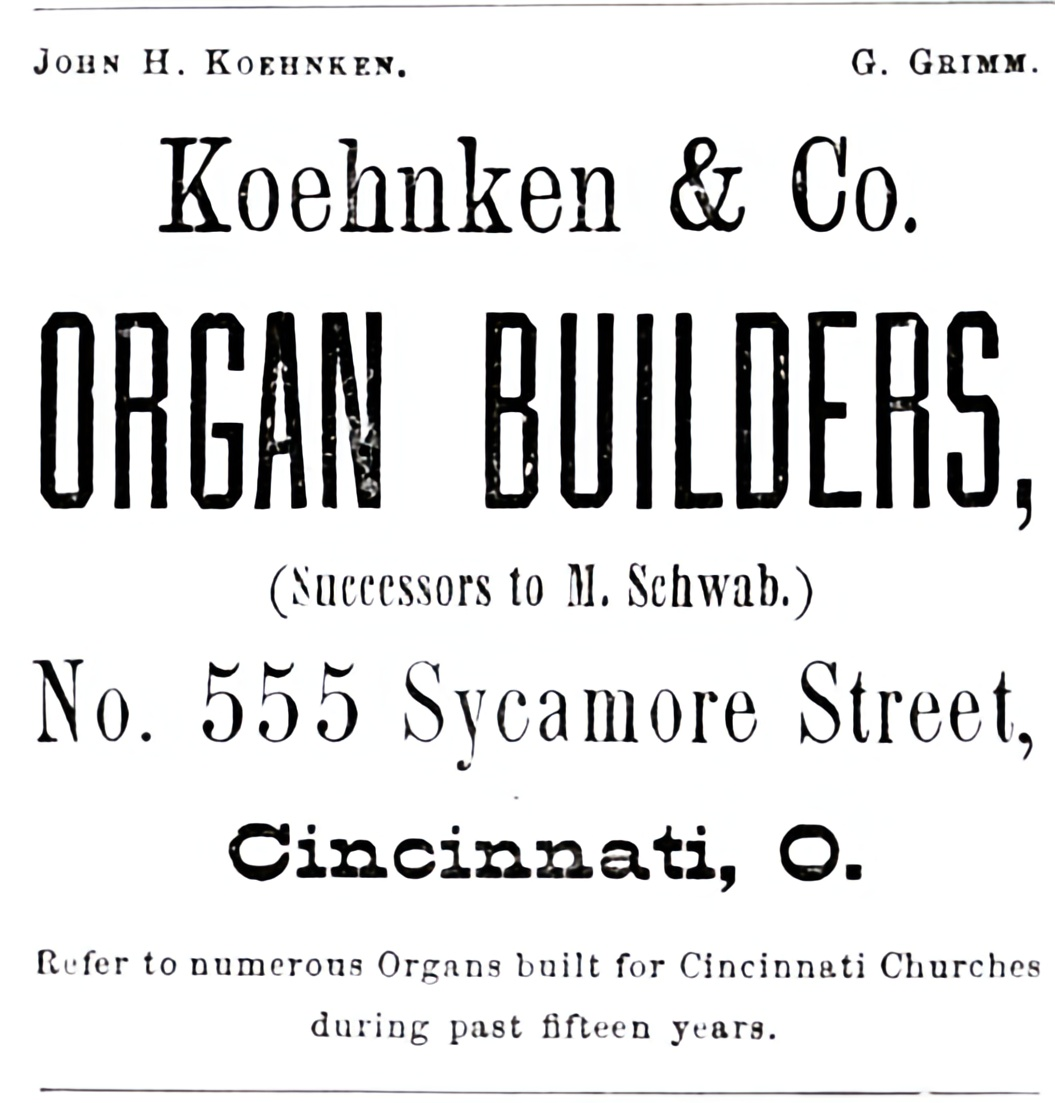
Advertisement for Koehnken and Co., Organ Builders, Cincinnati, Ohio, 1871

Koehnken was born on September 14, 1819 on a farm in Altenbuhlstedt in the Lower Saxony area of Germany (not far from Bremen) and was apprenticed to a cabinetmaker. He worked as a cabinet maker for two years in Germany and two more in Wheeling, (West) Virginia, before coming to Cincinnati, Ohio, in 1839 with his older brother, Johann Koehnken (1812–1872). Both brothers worked in the organ building trade. Johann Koehnken, the older brother, variously went by the surnames Conkey, Konkey, and Koenke and built organs in Cincinnati through the 1840s before relocating to Louisville, Kentucky.

The younger of the two brothers, Johann Heinrich Koehnken, had worked under Matthias Schwab at his factory in Cincinnati. He obtained ownership of Schwab's factory on Sycamore Street in 1860. Here he was assisted by Gallus Grimm and the firm became Koehnken and Grimm by 1875. The two worked together for twenty-one years until Koehnken retired in 1896. In 1897, both Johann Heinrich Koehnken and Grimm died.

The firm continued under the name of Gallus Grimm's son as Edward Grimm and Company until 1908, when it was purchased by Alfred Mathers.

== Koehnken and Koehnken and Grimm Organs ==
- Holy Trinity Church (Cincinnati, Ohio), built in 1860, lost when church was razed.
- St. John's Church, Newport, Kentucky, built in 1860
- Union Methodist, Cincinnati, built in 1860
- St. Martin Evangelical Church, Cincinnati, built in 1860
- Holy Trinity Catholic Church, Dayton, Ohio, built in 1861
- St. Stephen Catholic Church, Hamilton, Ohio, built in 1861
- St. Paul Episcopal Church, Cincinnati, built in 1861
- St. Martin of Tours Catholic Church, Louisville, Kentucky, built in 1861
- St. Anthony Catholic Church, Cincinnati, built in 1863, rebuilt for use by Colombiere College, Clarkston, Michigan
- St. Henry Catholic Church, Cincinnati, built in 1863
- St. Louis Catholic Church, Buffalo, New York, built in 1863
- St. Mary Church, Madison, Indiana, built in 1864
- German Reformed Church, Covington, Kentucky, built in 1864
- Saint Francis Seraph Church, Cincinnati, built in 1864
- Old St. Mary's Church (Cincinnati, Ohio), built in 1864
- St. Brigid Catholic Church, Xenia, Ohio, built in 1864
- St. Clement Catholic Church, St. Bernard, Ohio, built in 1864, replaced in 1871 by other Koehnken organ
- Salem United Church of Christ, Cincinnati, built around 1865, rebuilt by Pilcher in 1942
- Isaac M. Wise Temple (formerly Plum Street Temple), Cincinnati, built in 1866
- Grace United Methodist Church, Newport, Kentucky, built around 1866
- St. Aloysius Catholic Church, Covington, Kentucky, built around 1868
- St. Mary's Catholic Church, Chillicothe, Ohio, built around 1868
- St. John's Unitarian Church, Cincinnati, built in 1868
- St. Patrick Catholic Church, Covington, Kentucky, built around 1871
- Calvary Episcopal Church, Cincinnati, built in 1871, rebuilt for All Saints Episcopal Church, Pleasant Ridge, Cincinnati
- Prince of Peace Lutheran Church/Trinity Lutheran Church, Cincinnati, built in 1871
- Central Christian Church, Cincinnati, built in 1872
- St. Francis de Sales Catholic Church, Cincinnati, built around 1872, rebuilt by Mathers and removed 1973
- St. John the Evangelist Catholic Church, Enochsburg, Indiana, built in 1873
- St. George Catholic Church, Clifton, Cincinnati, built in 1874
- First Baptist Church, Covington, Kentucky, built in 1875
- Mother of God Catholic Church, Covington, Kentucky, built in 1875
- St. Peter's Lutheran Church, Columbus, Ohio, built in about 1875
- St. Aloysius Catholic Church, Sayler Park, Cincinnati, built around 1878
- Assumption Catholic Church, Mount Healthy, Cincinnati, built in 1878
- St. John's United Church of Christ, Madison, Indiana, built in 1879
- First Unitarian Church, Cincinnati, built in 1879
- St. John's United Church of Christ, Batesville, Indiana, built in about 1879
- St. Joseph Catholic Church, Hamilton, Ohio, built in 1880
- St. Xavier Catholic Church, Cincinnati, built in 1882, rebuilt by Hilgreen-Lane and removed in 1973
- St. Paul Congregational Church, Cincinnati, built in 1883
- St. Mary's Episcopal Church, Hillsboro, Ohio, built in 1885
- Immaculate Conception Catholic Church, Kenton, Ohio, built in 1887
- Our Lady of Perpetual Help Catholic Church, Sedamsville, Cincinnati, built around 1888, relocated to Holy Family Catholic Church, Price Hill, Cincinnati
- Holy Trinity Catholic Church, Cleveland, Ohio, built around 1890
- Concordia Lutheran Church, Cincinnati, built in 1891
- Asbury Third Methodist Church, Cincinnati, built around 1893, removed in 1971
- Clifton Methodist Church, Cincinnati, built in 1893
- Sacred Heart Catholic Church, Louisville, Kentucky, built in 1893
- Holy Cross Catholic Church, Mt. Adams, Cincinnati, built in 1895, relocated to Immaculata (now called Holy Cross-Immaculata), Mt. Adams, Cincinnati, in 1973
- First Presbyterian Church, Newport, Kentucky, built around 1893
- St. Mary's Catholic Church, Shawnee, Ohio, built in 1895, relocated to St. John Lutheran Church, Chehalis, Washington
- Immaculate Conception Catholic Church, Newport, Kentucky, built around 1897
- Saints Peter and Paul Catholic Church, Reading, Ohio, built around 1897
- Church of the Nazarene, Delaware, Ohio
- Covenant-First Presbyterian, Cincinnati
- First Presbyterian Church, Glendale, Ohio
- Mount Street Temple, Cincinnati
- Phillipus United Church of Christ, Cincinnati
- St. Aloysius Catholic Church, Bridgetown, Cincinnati
- St. Joseph Catholic Church, Cold Spring, Kentucky
- St. Paul Episcopal Church, Newport, Kentucky
- St. Peter Reformed Church, Cincinnati
- Chapel of the Holy Spirit / Harcourt Parish Episcopal Church at Kenyon College, Gambier, Ohio
- University of Dayton, Chapel of the Immaculate Conception, Dayton, Ohio
