= Carolyn Hester =

American musician

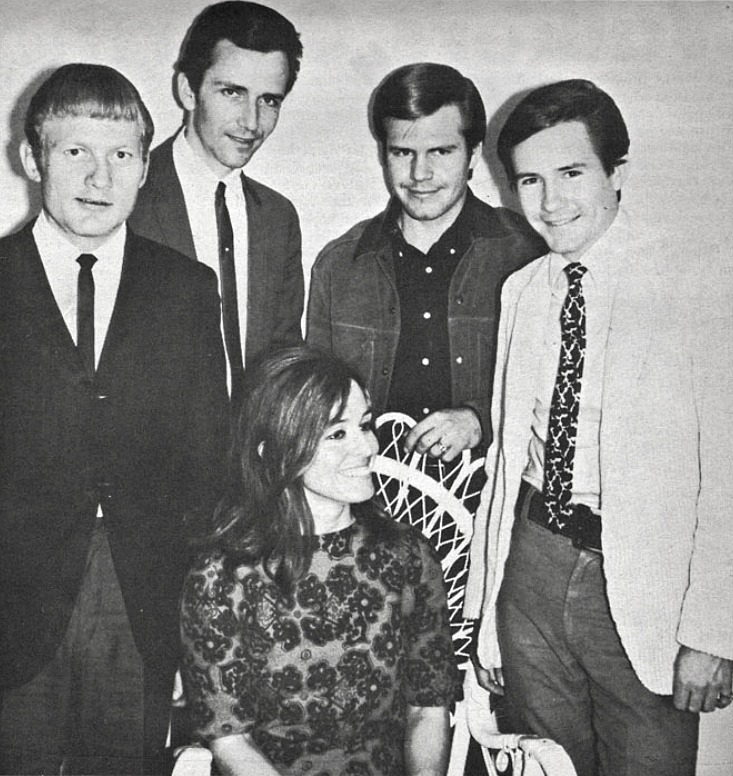
- Hester (seated) with the Bobby Fuller Four in 1966

Background information
- Born: Carolyn Sue Hester; January 28, 1937 (age 89); Waco, Texas, U.S.
- Genre: Folk
- Occupation: Singer
- Instruments: Vocals, guitar
- Years active: 1957–present
- Label: Columbia
- Website: carolynhester.com

Carolyn Sue Hester is an American folk singer and songwriter. She was a figure in the early 1960s American folk music revival.

== Biography ==
Hester's first album was produced by Norman Petty in 1957. She made her second album for Tradition Records, run by the Clancy Brothers, in 1960. She became known for "The House of the Rising Sun" and "She Moved Through the Fair".

Hester was one of many young Greenwich Village singers who rode the 1960s folk music wave. In 1960, she helped launch Gerde's Folk City. She appeared on the cover of the May 30, 1964, issue of the Saturday Evening Post. Don Heckman of the Los Angeles Times wrote that Hester was "one of the originals—one of the small but determined gang of ragtag, early-'60s folk singers who cruised the coffee shops and campuses, from Harvard Yard to Bleecker Street, convinced that their music could help change the world." Hester, dubbed "The Texas Songbird," was politically active, spearheading the controversial boycott of the television program Hootenanny when Pete Seeger was blacklisted from it.

John H. Hammond signed Hester to Columbia Records in 1960. That same year Hester met Richard Fariña, and they married 18 days later. They separated after less than two years. In 1961, Hester met Bob Dylan and invited him to play on her third album, her first on the Columbia label. Recorded at Columbia Studio A in New York City in September 1961, it marked Dylan's first official studio session. Hammond, her producer, quickly signed Dylan to the label. Hester turned down the opportunity to join a folk trio with Peter Yarrow and Paul Stookey, who then found stardom with Mary Travers as Peter, Paul, & Mary. Hester collaborated with Bill Lee and Bruce Langhorne, but she concentrated on traditional material.

In 1963 while in London, on one or possibly more occasions she recorded seven songs in front of a live television audience for the UK regional television folk and blues music series Hullabaloo, presented by the Scottish folksinger Rory McEwen; these sessions were released on DVD in 2020. In the late 1960s she explored psychedelic music as part of the Carolyn Hester Coalition before taking time off to raise her two daughters.

Hester has disputed David Hajdu's depiction of her marriage to Fariña in his book Positively 4th Street: The Lives and Times of Joan Baez, Bob Dylan, Mimi Baez Fariña, and Richard Fariña. She has claimed that there are exaggerations in his description of the relationships among Dylan, Baez, Hester, and the Fariñas. She has denied that Fariña was as close to Dylan as some rock historians claim and has strongly disputed that Fariña was in any way responsible for Dylan's success as Hajdu suggested. Hajdu also suggested that Hester had an ongoing rivalry with Baez and her sister Mimi. To this day, Hester maintains that, on the contrary, she did not and does not know Baez well and that they never were rivals personally or professionally.

In 1969, Hester married the jazz pianist-producer-songwriter David Blume, the composer of The Cyrkle's 1966 Top 40 hit "Turn Down Day." Together Hester and Blume formed the Outpost label. They also started an ethnic dance club in Los Angeles.

In the 1980s she returned to recording and touring. She and Nanci Griffith performed Bob Dylan's "Boots of Spanish Leather" at Dylan's Thirtieth Anniversary Tribute Concert at Madison Square Garden in 1992.

In 1999, Hester released a Tom Paxton tribute album. She appeared on the A&E television Biography of Bob Dylan in August 2000. Hester was awarded the Lifetime Achievement Award by the World Folk Music Association in 2003.

Blume died in the spring of 2006. Hester closed the dance club Cafe Danssa a year after his death.

As of spring 2022, Hester continued to perform and tour with her daughters Amy Blume and Karla Blume. They recorded an album We Dream Forever, released in 2010.

== Discography ==
- Scarlet Ribbons (1958) (Coral, LP)
- Carolyn Hester (1961) (Tradition, LP)
- Carolyn Hester (1962) (Columbia, LP)
- This Life I'm Living (1963) (Columbia, LP)
- That's My Song (1964) (Dot, LP)
- Carolyn Hester at Town Hall (1965) (Dot, LP)
- At Town Hall Two (1965) (Dot, LP)
- The Carolyn Hester Coalition (1969) (Metromedia, LP)
- Magazine (1970) (Metromedia, LP)
- Carolyn Hester (1973) (RCA)
- Music Medicine (1982) (Outpost, cassette)
- Warriors of the Rainbow (1986) (Outpost, LP and cassette)
- From These Hills (1996) (Road Goes on Forever, CD)
- A Tom Paxton Tribute (1999) (Road Goes on Forever, CD)
- We Dream Forever (2009) (Crazy Creek Records, CD)

=== Reissues of early work ===
- Carolyn Hester (1994) (Sony), CD reissue of Carolyn Hester (originally on the Columbia label)
- Carolyn Hester at Town Hall (1994) (Bear Family), CD reissue of both Town Hall albums
- Dear Companion (1995) (Bear Family), CD box set reissue of Carolyn Hester (originally on the Columbia label), This Life I'm Living and That's My Song with outtakes and alternate recordings
- Texas Songbird (1995) (Road Goes on Forever), CD reissue of Warriors of the Rainbow and Music Medicine
- The Tradition Album (1995) (Road Goes on Forever), CD reissue of Carolyn Hester (originally on the Tradition label) with four new tracks
- The Tradition Years (1996) (Empire Musicwerks), CD remaster of Carolyn Hester (originally on the Tradition label)
- The Carolyn Hester Coalition (2008) (Phantom Sound & Vision), CD remaster of the Metromedia LP
- Magazine (2008) (Phantom Sound & Vision), CD remaster of the Metromedia LP
- Carolyn Hester Introduces Bob Dylan (2013) (Jasmine Music), double CD including Scarlet Ribbons, Carolyn Hester −1960, Carolyn Hester – 1961, and Bob Dylan (his debut album); the CD concludes with Dylan's first electric single, "Mixed-Up Confusion" / "Corrina, Corrina"
