= Carrollton Historic District =

Carrollton Historic District may refer to:

- Carrollton Downtown Historic District, Carrollton, GA, listed on the NRHP in Georgia
- South Carrollton Residential Historic District, Carrollton, GA, listed on the NRHP in Georgia
- Carrollton Courthouse Square Historic District, Carrollton, IL, listed on the NRHP in Illinois
- Carrollton Historic District (Carrollton, Kentucky), listed on the NRHP in Kentucky
- Carrollton, Louisiana, which includes or also known as Carrollton Historic District, listed on the NRHP in Louisiana
- Carrollton Historic District (Carrollton, Mississippi), listed on the NRHP in Mississippi
