= Carroll County High School (Kentucky) =

Location
- 1706 Highland Ave; Carrollton, Kentucky 41008; United States
- Coordinates: 38°40′59.08″N 85°9′24.44″W

Information
- Type: Public
- School district: Carroll County Public Schools (Kentucky)
- Principal: Crystal Harris
- Teaching staff: 29.00 (FTE)
- Grades: 9-12
- Enrollment: 582 (2023-2024)
- Student to teacher ratio: 20.07
- Colors: Black & Gold
- Mascot: Panther
- Nickname: Panthers/Lady Panther
- Website: cchs.ccpanthers.com

Carroll County High School is a secondary school located at 1706 Highland Ave in the city of Carrollton, Kentucky, United States. It is part of the Carroll County Public Schools (Kentucky) district. The current principal of the school is Crystal Harris.
