= Carroll High School (Yekepa) =

Coordinates: 7.57557°N 8.55137°W

- Yekepa; Liberia

Information
- Type: Coeducational high school
- Motto: Ad Astra Per Ardua (To the Stars Through Hard Work)
- Religious affiliations: Roman Catholic, Congregation of Christian Brothers
- Colours: Navy and sky blue
- Mascot: The Cobra
- Team name: Cobras

Bishop Francis Carroll High School was founded in 1969, by the Congregation of Christian Brothers, a Catholic religious order founded by Edmund Ignatius Rice, as a secondary school whose purpose was to provide inexpensive education to young men of Liberia. The school was also intended to serve as a minor seminary, which would attract Liberians to the Catholic priesthood.

Grassfield was chosen as the location after a meeting between Bishop Francis Carroll, the Brother Superior of the Christian Brothers, and the management of the Liberian American and Swedish Mining Company (LAMCO). Grassfield had served as the first operational site of LAMCO, when the company began mining operations in Liberia. Now that they were moving to Yekepa, they decided to lease their facilities at Grassfield to the Christian Brothers.

The history of Carroll High School can be divided into four periods: The Grassfield Days, The Yekepa Days, The War School and the Post-War Carroll High. The Grassfield Days cover 1969–1979, the Yekepa Days 1980–1990, and War School covers 1991- 1997. The post war Carroll High period began after the national elections in Liberia in 1997 and covers through to the present day.

== The Grassfield Days ==
In January 1969, three Brothers, the late Br. Doherty (1st principal), Br. Fogarty, Dean of Boys and Br. Chincotta, music director, arrived to start an all-boys boarding school in the interior of Liberia. Later that year, 70 students enrolled at the school and the school population grew to as many as 500 during this period. The campus consisted of 40 family bungalows and wooden homes, equipped with hot and cold-water facilities, a rarity in those days. In addition to taking first place in the national exams for ten consecutive years, the school became known for its staging of rock operas including Jesus Christ Superstar, Joseph and his Amazing Technicolour Dreamcoat, Godspell, Tommy, Rock and Ipi Ntombi.

== The Yekepa Days ==
The second phase of CHS's history began with the transfer of the school from Grassfield to Yekepa. The school was transformed from an all-boys boarding school, to a co-educational day school. Many of the musicians in Liberia attribute the CHS influence to their success. Before the war, Cobras were instrumental in starting musical groups around the country including the Cuttington Music Society and the University of Liberia's band. In 1990, the school was closed due to the outbreak of the civil war.

== The War School ==
The school was opened several times during the fourteen-year period of the civil war, but its continued existence was always threatened by the harassments, intimidation and destruction that came with the war.

== Post-war Carroll High School ==
Presently, the school is in operation in Yekepa. The staff consists of Liberians.

- The school colors are navy blue and sky blue.
- The school mascot is the Cobra.
- The motto is Ad Astra Per Ardua (To the Stars Through Hard Work).
