= Piper to the End =

Celtic folk song by Mark Knopfler

"Piper to the End" is a Celtic folk song written by Mark Knopfler, the lead singer and songwriter for the rock band Dire Straits. The song is the final track on Knopfler's solo album Get Lucky.

The song is about Knopfler's uncle Freddie who was a piper of the 1st Battalion, Tyneside Scottish, the Black Watch, Royal Highland Regiment. Freddie carried his pipes into action in World War II and was killed with fellow fighters at Ficheux, near Arras in the north of France in May 1940. He was just 20 years old.

Knopfler describes the moment of Freddie's death in the latter's own words:

This has been a day to die on
Now the day is almost done
Here the pipes will lay beside me
Silent with the battle drum

Knopfler explains that he never knew Freddie personally, his mother's brother, but that he was very close to his uncle Kingsley, Freddie's older brother. Kingsley taught Knopfler to play the boogie-woogie piano.

Knopfler explained in an interview, "The pipes always made sense to me, and growing up in Glasgow as well as Newcastle, in my grandmother's home, there were Jimmy Shand records, so the sound of Celtic music always seems familiar to me."
