= Ghent Historic District (New Bern, North Carolina) =

Historic district in North Carolina, United States

- U.S. National Register of Historic Places
- U.S. Historic district
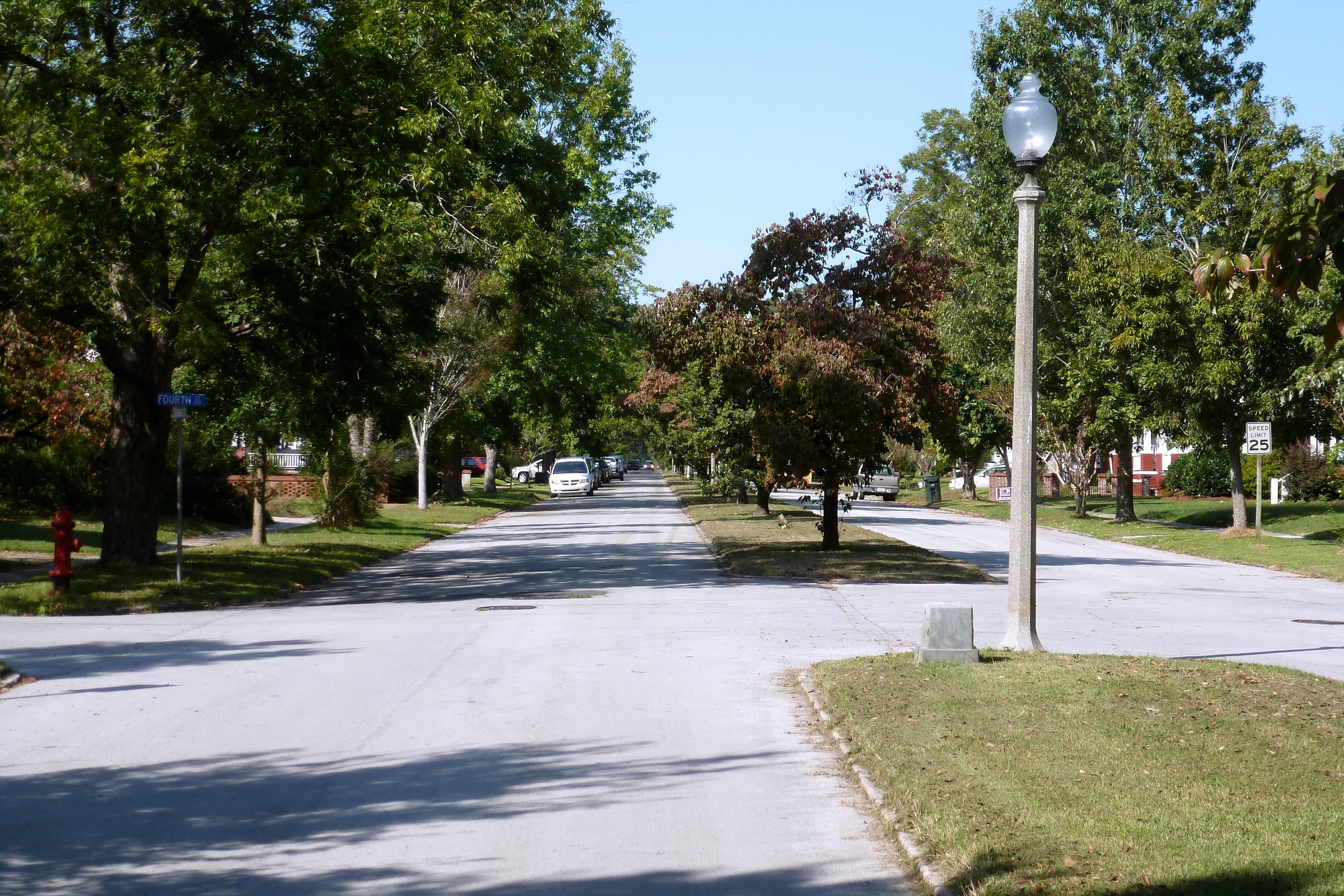
- Ghent Historic District, September 2012

- Location within North Carolina Location within the United States
- Location: Roughly bounded by Trent Blvd., First St., Park Ave., and Seventh St., New Bern, North Carolina
- Coordinates: 35°6′18″N 77°3′45″W
- Area: 67 acres (27 ha)
- Built: 1906
- Architectural style: Colonial Revival, Bungalow/Craftsman, Vernacular side--hall
- NRHP reference No.: 88000226
- Added to NRHP: March 17, 1988

Ghent Historic District is a national historic district located at New Bern, Craven County, North Carolina, United States. It encompasses 191 contributing buildings developed as a suburban residential neighborhood in New Bern between 1912 and 1941. The district is characterized by dwellings in the Colonial Revival and Bungalow / American Craftsman styles.

It was listed on the National Register of Historic Places in 1988.
