= Cincinnati Caledonian Pipes and Drums =

American pipe band

- Established: c. 1912
- Location: Cincinnati, Ohio
- Grade: 5
- Pipe major: Chris Ingram
- Drum sergeant: Johnny Hume
- Tartan: muted MacKenzie
- Website: www.cincypipesanddrums.org

Cincinnati Caledonian Pipes and Drums is a pipe band based in Cincinnati, Ohio. They have been honored to play for The Black Watch, share a stage with Rod Stewart, play the half time show for the Cincinnati Bengals, and perform at the Cincinnati Celtic Festival since it started in the early 1990s. The band has led the Cincinnati St. Patrick’s Day parade since at least 1969. Their big event each year is the annual Tartan Day Cèilidh held in conjunction with National Tartan Day in early April.

== History ==
=== The early years ===
The Cincinnati Caledonian Pipes and Drums was first formed around 1912, making it one of the oldest bands in the United States, by a Scottish immigrant, William Lorne Nimmo, whose family first moved to Canada then to Cincinnati. William Nimmo was a Lieutenant in the police force. After moving to Cincinnati, Nimmo set about putting together a pipe band, and as he states in his autobiography “I organized a pipe band, assisted by some good businessmen of the Caledonian Society.” When the band was first started, it had some 20 members. During World War I the band gained much notoriety by leading weekly parades supporting the war effort and Liberty Bond drives, visiting the training camps, hospitals, Red Cross and other affairs in the interest of building up morale. It was after World War I when a number of veterans from the Seaforth Highlanders regiment, now known as The Highlanders (Seaforth, Gordons and Camerons), joined the band that it adopted the Mackenzie tartan and the regimental hat badge (a stag's head with the motto Cuidich n'Righ – Support the King) both of which are still proudly worn today. In the 1930s, some of the members spent considerable time traveling the States in a converted Chevy school bus they referred to as "the Wee Hoose" complete with a grand set of great highland antlers attached to the front grill.

=== Mid-century ===
In the 1950s, the band was given new life under the direction of pipe major Alvin Spivak, and once again support from the Caledonian Society of Cincinnati, which provided money for new uniforms and two sets of bagpipes. Included in the roster was piper Lomond Nimmo, son of the founder, William. In 1965, the band made 37 appearances including the Ohio State Fair. In 1968, the band led the St. Patrick's Day Parade. Since then, the band has continuously played various events including an annual Tartan Ball, held in the 1970s and 1980s, the St. Andrew's Day Celebration held by the Caledonian Society of Cincinnati, and other annual and one time events. At that time, the band changed its name to the Caledonian Pipes, Drums and Dancers, as the band included a thriving dance section which was incorporated into all its performances and marched behind the drummers. The 1980s saw the band begin attending competitions at Highland Games. In the mid-1990s, the band began re-building a competition unit. Very soon after, they fielded 3 units including a grade 5, grade 4, and grade 5 youth band. After leadership changes in 1999–2000, they fielded a grade 4 competition band under the direction of P/M Mike Rackers, finishing 4th at Glengarry Highland Games (the North American Championships) in Ontario.

=== 21st century ===
In 2001, after some members split to form Mad Anthony Wayne Pipe Band, only a grade 5 band returned. By 2005, the grade 5 band finished 2nd at Stone Mountain Highland Games resulting in a move up to grade 4 the following year. At the same time, the Mad Anthony Wayne Pipe Band, which had enjoyed an initial two years of growth and musical advancement as well as an increased local profile, underwent a leadership change which lead to a steady decline which ultimately limited its ability to function. Consequently, in 2006 Mad Anthony Wayne merged with the Caledonians and incited a great influx of local and non-local players which created a grade 3 competition band with CCP&D. They competed at such games as Alma, Fergus, Ligonier, and Stone Mountain. The grade 3 band disbanded after the 2007 competition season. Achievements in 2008 included 1st place grade 5 at Kentucky Scottish Weekend, 1st place grade 5 at Glasgow, KY Highland Games, and 1st place grade 5 at Ohio Scottish Games (Ohio Valley Branch Championship). There were several successful results in 2009 at the grade 5 level with some judges awarding "above grade level"., A band combined of Cincinnati and Louisville members competed in 2010 in grade IV as the River Cities Pipe Band. Cincinnati Caledonian also competed as a grade V band. By 2011, the band took a break from competition.

The band celebrated its 100th anniversary in 2012. A Centennial Celebration was held on Sept. 2nd with many band members, past and present, in attendance. The grade 5 competition band placed 1st at the Ohio Scottish Games and 3rd at Alma (MI) Highland Games. In 2013, the band was upgraded to grade 4 but only competed once at Smoky Mtn Games in Marysville, TN. A grade 5 band also competed at that event. In 2014 the pipe band only fielded a grade 5 band and competed at Smoky Mtn Games, Ohio Scottish Games, and Central Kentucky Games. Competitions in 2015 included Ohio Scottish Games and Ligonier In 2016, the band ventured to the Chicago Highland Games for the first time with a good showing with 2nd-place finish as well as Ohio Scottish Games. Since 2012, the band has been performing during special event weekends at the Ohio Renaissance Festival.

== Previous Pipe Majors ==
Past P/M's include Arch Ott, Ray Scott, Russ Spaulding (former P/M for City of Chattanooga Pipe Band), and Peter Kent (recently with City of Washington Pipe Band, a grade one pipe band).

== Recordings ==
- New Beginnings (2006)
