= Carroll County Public Schools (Kentucky) =

School district in Kentucky, US

Carroll County Public Schools is a school district located in Carrollton, Kentucky that serves all students residing in Carroll County, Kentucky. The current superintendent is Casey Jaynes. The current Assistant Superintendent is Jonica Ray.

== Schools ==
=== Elementary schools ===
- Richard B Cartmell Elementary School (Grades 2–4)
- Kathryn Winn Primary School (Grades K-1)

=== Middle schools ===
- Carroll County Middle School (Grades 5–8)

=== High schools ===
- Carroll County High School (Kentucky)

=== Additional programs ===
- Carroll County Child Development Center
- Carroll County Area Technology Center
