= Carroll County Airport =

Carroll County Airport may refer to:

- Carroll County Airport (Arkansas) in Berryville, Arkansas, United States (FAA: 4M1)
- Carroll County Airport (Tennessee) in Huntingdon, Tennessee, United States (FAA: HZD)
- Carroll County Regional Airport in Westminster, Maryland, United States (FAA: DMW)
- Carroll County-Tolson Airport in Carrollton, Ohio, United States (FAA: TSO)
