= Ghent Historic District (Ghent, Kentucky) =

- U.S. National Register of Historic Places
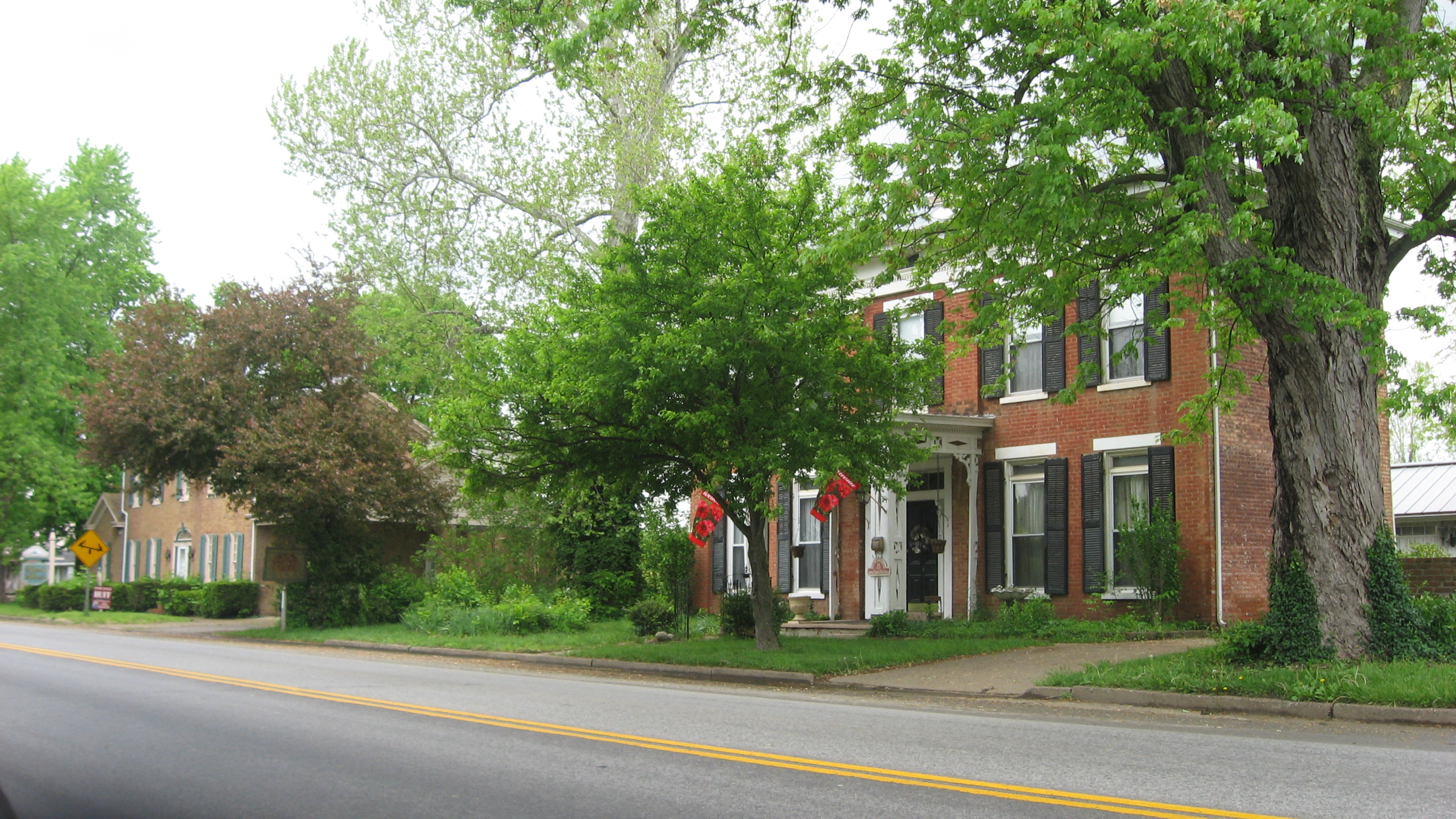

- Location within Kentucky Location within the United States
- Location: US 42, Fishing, Ann, Main Cross, Ferry, Water, Union and Liberty Sts., Ghent, Kentucky
- Coordinates: 38°44′18″N 85°03′36″W
- Area: 63 acres (25 ha)
- Built: 1813
- Architectural style: Mid 19th Century Revival, Early Vernacular
- NRHP reference No.: 83002623
- Added to NRHP: August 25, 1983

The Ghent Historic District in Ghent, Kentucky is a 63-acre (25 ha) historic district which was listed on the National Register of Historic Places in 1983.

It included 101 contributing buildings and four contributing sites in an area including, or roughly bounded by, U.S. Route 42, Fishing, Ann, Main Cross, Ferry, Water, Union, and Liberty Streets.

The district includes the town's historic core.
