= Carrollton Historic District (Carrollton, Kentucky) =

Historic district in Kentucky, United States

- U.S. National Register of Historic Places
- U.S. Historic district
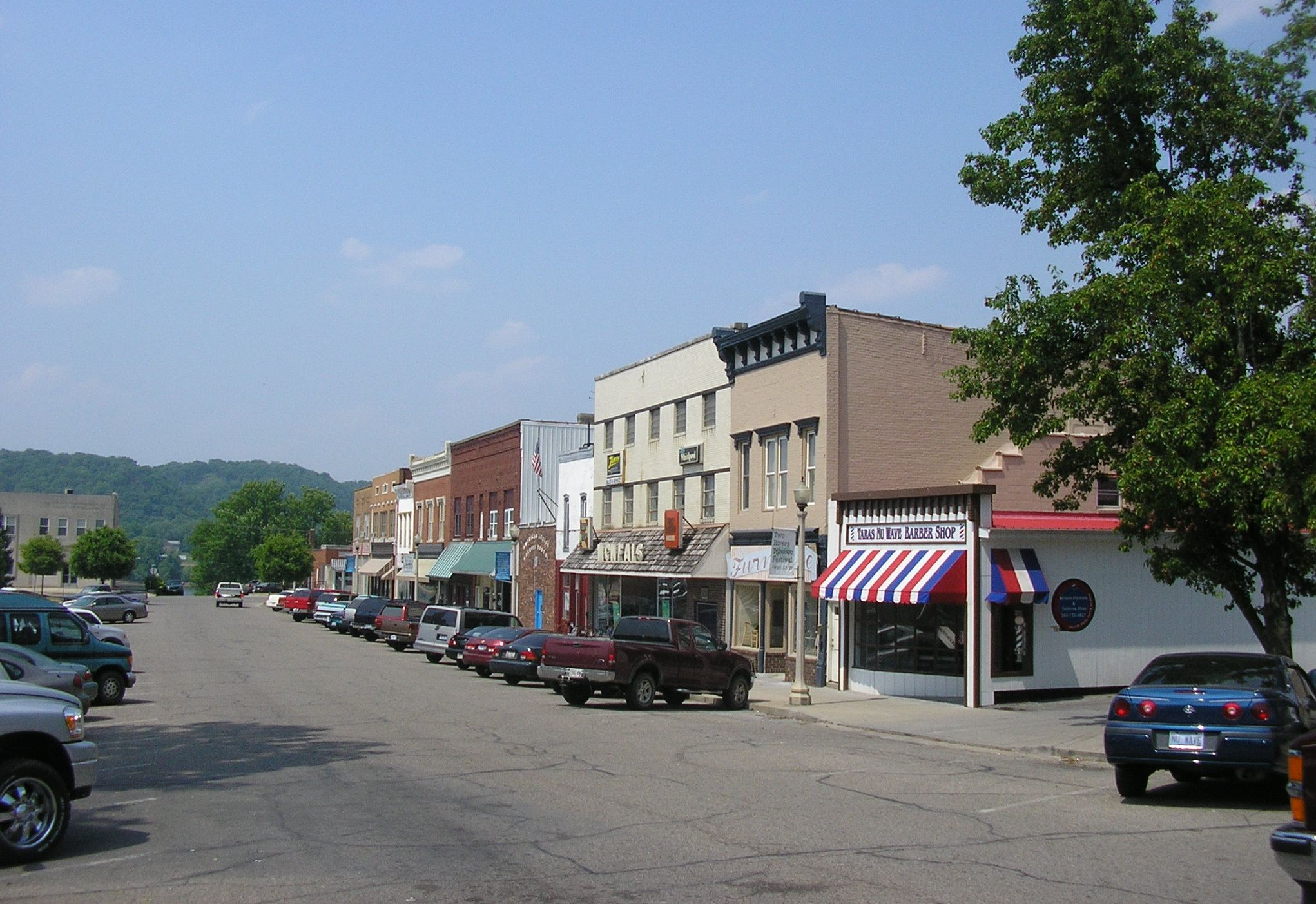

- Location within Kentucky Location within the United States
- Location: Roughly bounded by Main, Polk, 2nd, 7th, and both sides of Highland Ave. to 11th St., Carrollton, Kentucky
- Coordinates: 38°40′45″N 85°10′40″W
- Area: 92 acres (37 ha)
- Architectural style: Late Victorian, Italianate
- NRHP reference No.: 82001553
- Added to NRHP: November 12, 1982

The Carrollton Historic District in Carrollton, Kentucky is a 92 acres (37 ha) historic district which was listed on the National Register of Historic Places in 1982. The listing included 334 contributing buildings. The district is roughly bounded by Main, Polk, 2nd, 7th, and both sides of Highland Ave. to 11th St.

It includes the Carroll County Courthouse, designed by the McDonald Brothers of Louisville.
