= General Butler State Resort Park =

State park in Kentucky, United States

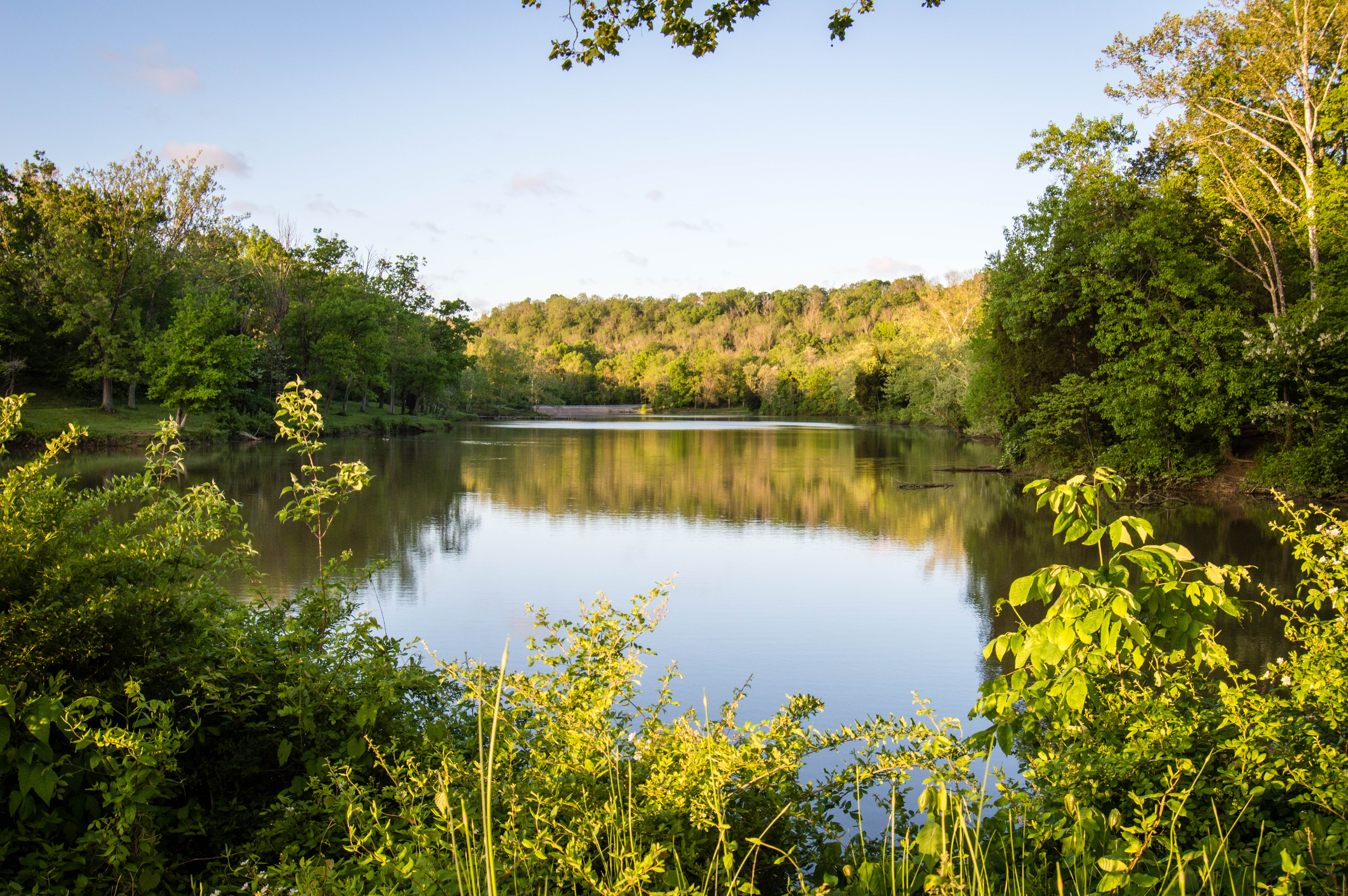

- Location within Kentucky Location within the United States
- Type: Kentucky state park
- Location: Carroll County, Kentucky, United States
- Coordinates: 38°40′14″N 85°09′15″W
- Area: 791 acres (320 ha)
- Elevation: 705 ft (215 m)
- Established: 1931
- Administrator: Kentucky Department of Parks
- Website: Official website

General Butler State Resort Park is a public recreation area adjoining the city of Carrollton in Carroll County, Kentucky, United States. The state park is named for General William O. Butler, a soldier in both the War of 1812 and the Mexican–American War. The 791-acre (320 ha) park features a lodge, cabins and campground, fishing and canoeing on Butler Lake, trails for hiking and mountain biking.

== Butler-Turpin State Historic House ==
The Butler-Turpin State Historic House, also known as the Butler House, is located in the park and is open for guided tours as a historic house museum. The home was built in 1859 in the Greek Revival style. It contains original furniture and original documents and other family objects. The grounds and family cemetery are also open.

== Activities and amenities ==
- Accommodations: The park has a 53-room lodge with swimming pool, cottages, and a 111-site campground.
- Trails: More than five miles of trails are offered for hiking and mountain biking.
- Fishing and paddle-boating are available on 30-acre Butler Lake.
- Ski area: The park formerly hosted a ski area, Ski Butler!, which opened in 1981 and closed during the winter of 1997–98.
