= Carrollton, Kentucky =

- City
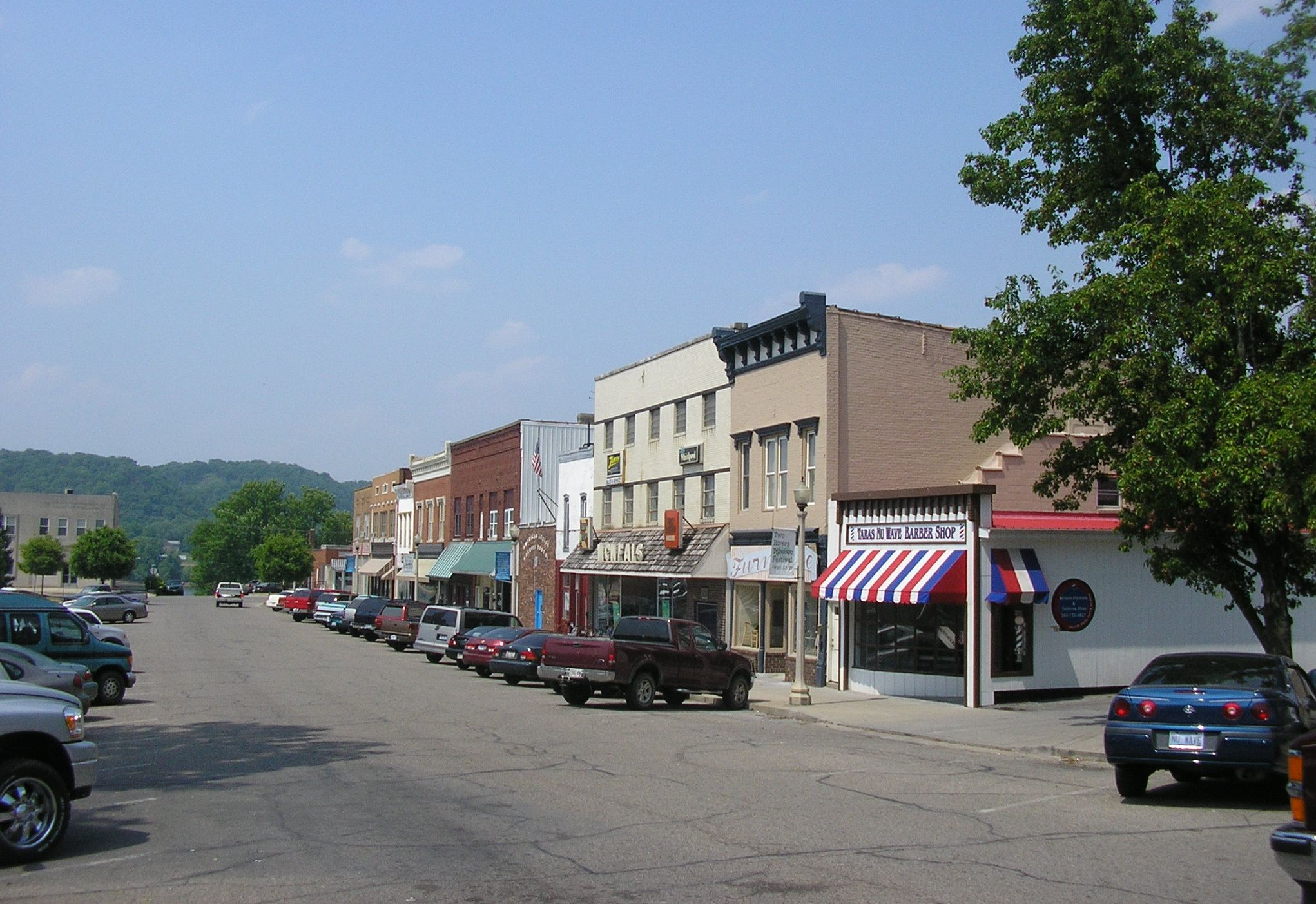
- Downtown Carrollton with Ohio River valley in background
- Motto: "Where Rivers and People Meet"
- Location of Carrollton in Carroll County, Kentucky.

- Location of Carrollton in Kentucky. Carrollton (the United States)
- Coordinates: 38°40′48″N 85°09′57″W
- Country: United States
- State: Kentucky
- County: Carroll

Area
  - Total: 2.09 sq mi (5.41 km^{2})
  - Land: 2.03 sq mi (5.27 km^{2})
  - Water: 0.054 sq mi (0.14 km^{2})
- Elevation: 482 ft (147 m)

Population (2020)
  - Total: 3,890
  - Estimate (2024): 3,955
  - Density: 1,910.9/sq mi (737.79/km^{2})
- Time zone: UTC-5 (Eastern (EST))
  - Summer (DST): UTC-4 (EDT)
- ZIP codes: 41008, 41045
- Area code: 502
- FIPS code: 21-13024
- GNIS feature ID: 2403999
- Website: www.carrolltonky.net

Carrollton is a home rule-class city in and the county seat of Carroll County, Kentucky, United States, at the confluence of the Ohio and Kentucky rivers. The population was 3,890 at the 2020 census.

== History ==
Carrollton was laid out in 1792, and it was known as Port William initially. It served as the county seat of Gallatin County until 1843 when the county was split, creating Carroll County. Port William was renamed Carrollton after Declaration of Independence signer Charles Carroll and became the seat of the new county. The town's first newspaper, the Carrollton Crier, was published in 1848. On September 3, 1863, during the Civil War, Confederates robbed the Southern Bank of Kentucky and were followed by the Union Army. Confederates also stole the sword of prominent resident William Orlando Butler, and he later caught up with the troops and retrieved it. The Louisville & Nashville Railroad was built near town in 1868 and eventually became more important to the town's economy than river traffic. It did cause a spike in agricultural production, especially tobacco.

Carrollton's most severe flood was the Ohio River flood of 1937; floodwaters crested at 79.9 feet (24.4 m).

It has one of the state's largest tobacco markets, and the population has remained steady since being recorded at 3,884 in the 1970 census. In 1988, the Carrollton bus disaster garnered national attention for what was one of the worst bus collisions in United States history.

== Geography ==
Carrollton is located in northern Carroll County. The city is situated on the Ohio River at the mouth of the Kentucky River. It is bordered by the city of Prestonville to the west across the Kentucky River. To the north, across the Ohio River, is Switzerland County, Indiana.

U.S. Route 42 passes through the center of the community, leading northeast 54 miles (87 km) to Cincinnati, Ohio, and southwest 55 miles (89 km) to Louisville. Interstate 71 runs 4 miles (6 km) south of the city roughly parallel to US 42, with access from Exit 44.

According to the United States Census Bureau, the city has a total area of 2.0 square miles (5.3 km^{2}), of which 0.008 square miles (0.02 km^{2}), or 0.42%, is water.

=== Climate ===
The climate in this area is characterized by hot, humid summers and generally mild to cool winters. According to the Köppen Climate Classification system, Carrollton has a humid subtropical climate, abbreviated "Cfa" on climate maps.

== Demographics ==
Historical population
Census	Pop.	Note	%±
1810	120		—
1830	323		—
1860	1,511		—
1870	1,098		−27.3%
1880	1,332		21.3%
1890	1,720		29.1%
1900	2,205		28.2%
1910	1,906		−13.6%
1920	2,281		19.7%
1930	2,409		5.6%
1940	2,910		20.8%
1950	3,226		10.9%
1960	3,218		−0.2%
1970	3,884		20.7%
1980	3,967		2.1%
1990	3,715		−6.4%
2000	3,846		3.5%
2010	3,938		2.4%
2020	3,890		−1.2%
2024 (est.)	3,955		1.7%
U.S. Decennial Census

=== 2020 census ===
As of the 2020 census, Carrollton had a population of 3,890. The median age was 37.0 years. 25.1% of residents were under the age of 18 and 16.4% of residents were 65 years of age or older. For every 100 females there were 99.3 males, and for every 100 females age 18 and over there were 93.0 males age 18 and over.

98.7% of residents lived in urban areas, while 1.3% lived in rural areas.

There were 1,536 households in Carrollton, of which 31.8% had children under the age of 18 living in them. Of all households, 34.8% were married-couple households, 19.5% were households with a male householder and no spouse or partner present, and 34.5% were households with a female householder and no spouse or partner present. About 32.5% of all households were made up of individuals and 14.4% had someone living alone who was 65 years of age or older.

There were 1,746 housing units, of which 12.0% were vacant. The homeowner vacancy rate was 3.1% and the rental vacancy rate was 8.0%.

Racial composition as of the 2020 census
Race	Number	Percent
White	3,350	86.1%
Black or African American	82	2.1%
American Indian and Alaska Native	20	0.5%
Asian	10	0.3%
Native Hawaiian and Other Pacific Islander	1	0.0%
Some other race	142	3.7%
Two or more races	285	7.3%
Hispanic or Latino (of any race)	384	9.9%

=== 2000 census ===
As of the census of 2000, there were 3,846 people, 1,598 households, and 987 families residing in the city. The population density was 1,715.4 inhabitants per square mile (662.3/km^{2}). There were 1,709 housing units at an average density of 762.3 per square mile (294.3/km^{2}). The racial makeup of the city was 78.99% White, 2.24% Black, 0.13% Native American, 0.18% Asian, 2.03% from other races, and 1.43% from two or more races. Hispanic or Latino of any race were 19.42% of the population.

There were 1,598 households, out of which 27.7% had children under the age of 18 living with them, 43.0% were married couples living together, 14.7% had a female householder with no husband present, and 38.2% were non-families. 33.9% of all households were made up of individuals, and 16.2% had someone living alone who was 65 years of age or older. The average household size was 2.29 and the average family size was 2.90.

In the city, the population was spread out, with 23.0% under the age of 18, 9.9% from 18 to 24, 27.3% from 25 to 44, 22.1% from 45 to 64, and 17.7% who were 65 years of age or older. The median age was 38 years. For every 100 females, there were 95.4 males. For every 100 females age 18 and over, there were 90.2 males.

The median income for a household in the city was $29,818, and the median income for a family was $41,193. Males had a median income of $32,563 versus $20,000 for females. The per capita income for the city was $14,376. About 13.9% of families and 20.2% of the population were below the poverty line, including 31.5% of those under age 18 and 26.2% of those age 65 or over.

== Economy ==
Carrollton has several major industries.

North American Stainless was founded in 1990 and is the largest fully integrated stainless steel producer in the United States. It has 1,600 employees and more than 500 suppliers. They are dedicated to melting steel and making steel products. NAS has invested more than $3.5 billion in the region since its founding, including expansions and upgrades to its facilities. They provide charitable donations to many causes in the community, including the local public school system.

== Education ==
Carrollton has a lending library, the Carroll County Public Library. Books and movies are available in both English and Spanish; also available are computers for free use. Activities offered are kids’ storytime, summer reading events, help sessions for adults who need tech support, and passport application assistance.

=== Public schools ===
The Carroll County Public Schools has approximately 2,042 students across seven schools: Carroll County Child Development Center (Preschool ages 3–5), Kathryn Winn Primary (Grades K–1), Richard B. Cartmell Elementary (Grades 2–4), Carroll County Middle School ( Grades 5–8), Carroll County High School (Grades 9–12), Carroll County Area Technology Center – Technical training (high school level), and the iLEAD Academy (9th to 12th).The Carroll County Schools participate in KHSAA sports such as Football, Baseball, Basketball, Soccer, Golf, Tennis, Volleyball, Bass Fishing, Track & Field, and Fast Pitch Softball. Additionally, Carroll County students participate in classes as the Area Technology Center such as Welding, Automotive Maintenance and Light Repair, Construction Carpentry, Electrical Technician, Information Technology, Clinical Medical Assisting, and Pre-Nursing.

=== Private schools ===
Christian Academy of Carrollton is a private school (PreK–12 ) with around 153 students, providing Bible-based education and offering sports like Basketball and Volleyball, though it is not part of the KHSAA.

=== Post-secondary education ===
Jefferson Community & Technical College, Carrollton Campus, s a public community college located at 1607 US Highway 227 in Carrollton, Kentucky. Established in 1991, the Carrollton campus offers programs in Engineering Technology, Applied Process Technology, and the Associate of Arts degree, which transfers to four-year institutions. With an enrollment of approximately 1,500 students each semester, JCTC Carrollton provides accessible education and workforce training opportunities to the local community.

== Parks and recreation ==
General Butler State Resort Park is located between Louisville and Cincinnati. It covers approximately 791 acres and was founded in 1931. Its name is in honor of General William O. Butler, a military man and politician. It has activities such as boating, fishing, swimming, and miniature golf. The park also features the Butler Turpin State Historic House.

Camp KYSOC consists of 123 acres and a 12-acre lake that was an Easter Seals camp from 1960 to 2010 before falling into disrepair. In recent years, the group Friends of Camp KYSOC have renovated parts of the park to include a nature center, a Braille trail, an indoor pool, an event hall available to rent, and the HOPE Center, a group for persons with disabilities.

== Arts and culture ==
=== Historic homes ===
The Butler-Turpin State Historic House, built in 1859, is located within General Butler State Park in Carrollton, Kentucky. The house is open to the public for guided tours by appointment from April through October. This house is famous for its 19th-century Greek Revival architecture and its connection to the family of General William O. Butler.

=== In literature and film ===
Marshmallow (2025) was filmed in Carrollton at Camp KYSOC because it provided the ideal summer camp setting. The crew needed a camp that wasn't going to be active during the months they were filming. Many locals served as extras in the movie, including local middle and high school students.

The town of Hargrave, Kentucky in the fiction of Wendell Berry is a fictionalized version of Carrollton. Berry uses Carrollton's original name, Port William, as the name for the town in which most of his stories take place. Berry portrays Hargrave as significantly larger and more urban than Port William (a fictionalized Port Royal, Kentucky). It is the center of local nightlife and professional services. Unlike the largely egalitarian rural society of Port William, there is an "upper crust" of professionals and landowners in Hargrave.
