= Market Park =

Market Park may refer to:

- Handlan's Park, St. Louis, Missouri
- Market Park, Crieff, Scotland, home of the Crieff Highland Games
- Washington Market Park, lower Manhattan, New York
- Victor Steinbrueck Park, Downtown Seattle, Washington, originally known as Market Park
