= Scottish Canadians =

Canadians of Scottish descent or heritage

Canèidianaich Albannach (Scottish Gaelic) Canadiens écossais (French)
- Scottish Canadians as a proportion of the population by census division

Total population
- 4,799,010; 13.9% of the total Canadian population (2016)

Regions with significant populations
- Canada
- Ontario: 2,101,100
- British Columbia: 828,145
- Alberta: 661,265
- Nova Scotia: 288,180
- Manitoba: 209,170
- Quebec: 202,515
- New Brunswick: 142,560
- Prince Edward Island: 50,685

Languages
- English, Scottish Gaelic (Canadian Gaelic dialect), French, Scots

Religion
- Christianity (including Presbyterian, Anglican, Baptist, Roman Catholic, United); Other religions

Related ethnic groups
- Scottish, English, Scotch-Irish, Métis, Ulster Scots Canadians, English Canadians, English Americans, Scottish Americans, Lowland Scots, Ulster Scots, other British Canadians

Scottish Canadians (Scottish Gaelic: Canèidianaich Albannach) are people of Scottish descent or heritage living in Canada. As the third-largest ethnic group in Canada and amongst the first Europeans to settle in the country, Scottish people have made a large impact on Canadian culture since colonial times. According to the 2016 Census of Canada, the number of Canadians claiming full or partial Scottish descent is 4,799,010, or 13.93% of the nation's total population. Prince Edward Island has the highest population of Scottish descendants at 41%.

The Scots-Irish Canadians are a similar ethnic group. They descended from Lowland Scots and Northern English people via Ulster and so some observe many of the same traditions as Scots.

Categorically, Scottish Canadians comprise a subgroup of British Canadians which is a further subgroup of European Canadians. (Note: Statistics Canada demi-decadal censuses officially use the name "British Isles Origins" for the various nationalities and ethnicities that are in the region. See 2016, 2011, or 2006 censuses as examples)

== History ==
Scottish Canadian Population History
Year	Pop.	±%
1871	549,946	—
1881	699,863	+27.3%
1901	800,154	+14.3%
1911	1,027,015	+28.4%
1921	1,173,625	+14.3%
1931	1,346,350	+14.7%
1941	1,403,974	+4.3%
1951	1,547,470	+10.2%
1961	1,902,302	+22.9%
1971	1,720,390	−9.6%
1981	1,415,200	−17.7%
1986	3,918,055	+176.9%
1991	4,248,365	+8.4%
1996	4,260,840	+0.3%
2001	4,157,210	−2.4%
2006	4,354,155	+4.7%
2011	4,714,970	+8.3%
2016	4,799,005	+1.8%
Source: Statistics Canada Note1: 1981 Canadian census did not include multiple ethnic origin responses, thus population is an undercount. Note2: 1996-present census populations are undercounts, due to the creation of the "Canadian" ethnic origin category.

=== Early Scottish settlement ===
Scottish people have a long history in Canada, dating back several centuries. Many towns, rivers, and mountains have been named in honour of Scottish explorers and traders such as Mackenzie Bay in the Yukon (named for Sir Alexander Mackenzie) or after locations in Scotland, such as Calgary, (named after a Scottish beach) and Banff, Alberta, named after Banff, Aberdeenshire. Most notably, the Atlantic province of Nova Scotia is Latin for "New Scotland". Once Scots formed the vanguard of the movement of Europeans across the continent. In more modern times, immigrants from Scotland have played a leading role in the social, political, and economic history of Canada, being prominent in banking, labour unions, and politics.

The first documented source of Scots in what would become Canada comes from the Saga of Eric the Red and the Viking expedition of 1010 AD to Vinland (literally, the land of meadows), which is believed to refer to the island of Newfoundland. The Viking prince Thorfinn Karlsefni took two Scottish slaves to Vinland. When the longships moored along the coast, they sent the slaves ashore to run along the waterfront to gauge whether it was safe for the rest of the crew to follow. After the Scots survived a day without being attacked by either human or animal, the Vikings deemed it safe to spend the night ashore. The expedition was abandoned three years later; the original sagas were passed on in an oral tradition and then written down 250 years later.

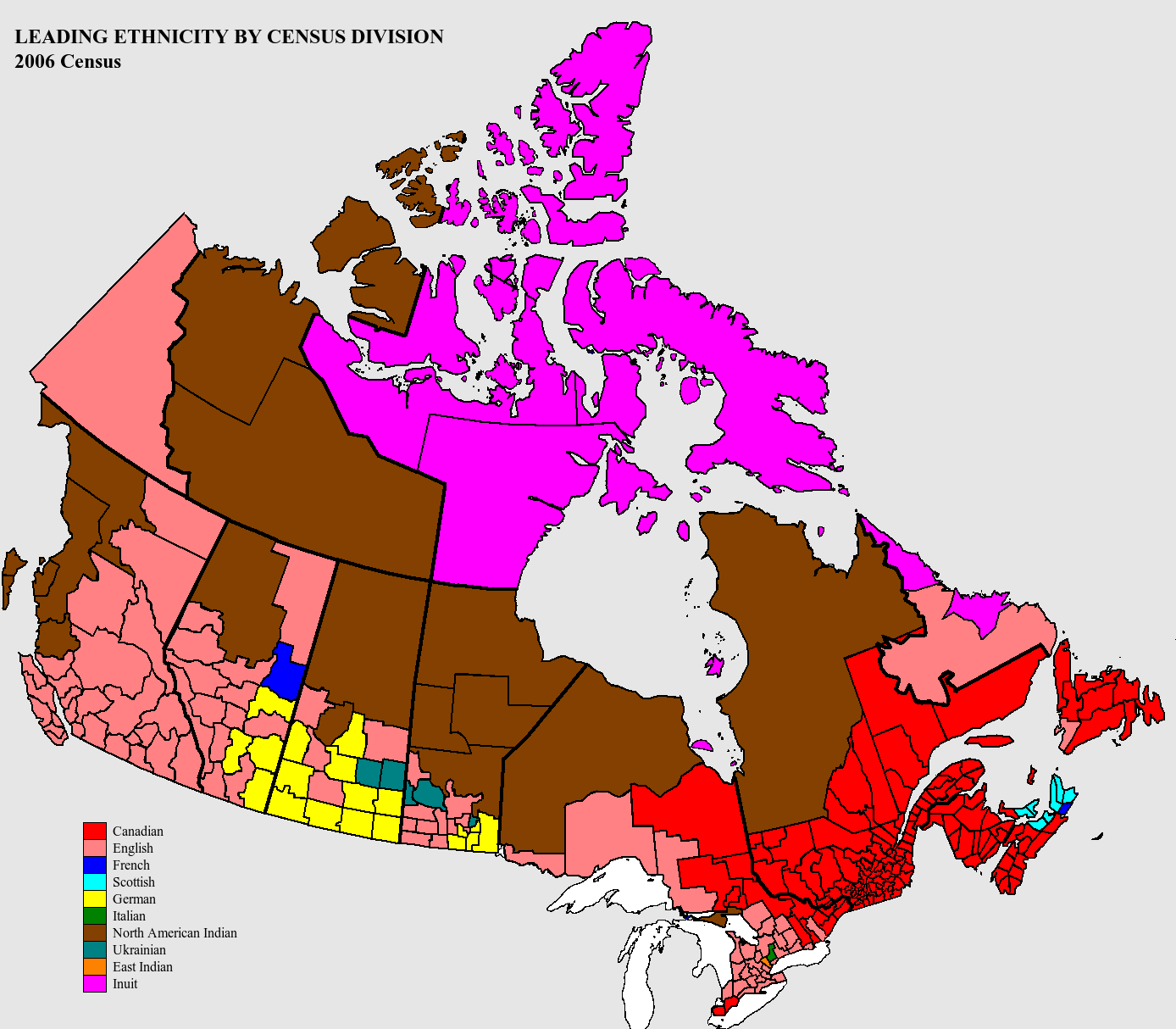
Self-identified Scottish Canadians are a plurality in parts of Nova Scotia and Prince Edward Island (areas coloured in cyan).

An apocryphal voyage in 1398 by a captain named Zichmni, believed to be Henry I Sinclair, Earl of Orkney, is also claimed to have reached Atlantic Canada as well as New England.

Scottish Canadians were also a part of the land theft, cultural loss and genocide of Indigenous Canadians, along with Irish Canadians and English Canadians.

==== Push factors ====
Troubles back in Scotland in the 18th and 19th centuries generated a steady flow of emigrants. Some sought political asylum following the failed Jacobite risings in 1688, 1715, and 1745. The Gàidhealtachd was traditionally Catholic, and many Gaels came to Canada after facing eviction for their religious beliefs.

Those immigrants who arrived after 1759 were mainly Highland farmers who had been forced off their crofts (rented land) during the Highland and Lowland Clearances to make way for sheep grazing due to the British Agricultural Revolution.

Others came as a result of famine. In 1846, potato crops were blighted by the same fungal disease responsible for the Great Irish Famine, and most Highland crofters were very dependent on potatoes as a source of food. Crofters were expected to work in appalling conditions, and although some landlords worked to lessen the effects of the famine on their tenants, many landlords simply resorted to eviction. In particular, John Gordon of Cluny became the target of criticism in newspapers when many of his crofters were reduced to living on the streets of Inverness. Gordon resorted to hiring a fleet of ships and forcibly transporting his Hebridean crofters to Canada, where they were conveniently abandoned on Canadian authorities. Some more sympathetic landlords supplied a free passage to what was hoped to be a better life. Crop failures continued into the 1850s and famine relief programmes became semi-permanent operations. During the ten years following 1847, from throughout the Highlands, over 16,000 crofters were shipped overseas to Canada and Australia.

==== Pull factors ====
Canada had plenty of land and jobs and new opportunities, which created a pull factor. The government made certain potential immigrants know of the advantages, sending agents to recruit Irish and Scottish emigrants to settle in western Canada between 1867 and the 1920s. The Canadian government hoped to develop the economy in the sparsely populated western part of the country. It set up offices in towns in Ireland and Scotland, and agents went up and down the land pasting up attractive posters, giving lectures, handing out pamphlets and trying one-on-one to persuade farmers and laborers of the virtues of life in Canada. Although many people agreed to emigrate, the agents faced competition from the United States, New Zealand, Australia, and South Africa, and opponents of emigration warned of hardship in Canada. The agents did not create 'emigration fever,' but they did tap into a sense of restlessness that, if nurtured, could result in a decision to emigrate.

=== Large-scale migration ===
Bumsted (1981) notes that between 1760 and 1860, millions of people emigrated from Great Britain. Before 1815, emigration was discouraged, but emigration from Scotland to the Maritime Provinces constituted one of the principal components of the exodus; by 1815, Scots formed one of the three major ethnic groups there. Most of the emigrants were unskilled Gaelic-speaking farmers, who gathered in isolated communities. The Maritimes attracted them because of the opportunity there to be left alone to pursue the traditional way of life.

A large group of Ulster Scots, many of whom had first settled in New Hampshire, moved to Truro, Nova Scotia in 1761. In 1772, a wave of Gaels began to arrive in Prince Edward Island, and in 1773 the ship Hector brought 200 Gaels to Pictou, beginning a new stream of Highland emigration — the town's slogan is "The Birthplace of New Scotland". At the end of the 18th century, Cape Breton Island had become a centre of Scottish Gaelic settlement, where only Scottish Gaelic was spoken.

A number of Scottish loyalists to the British crown, who had fled the United States in 1783, arrived in Glengarry County (in eastern Ontario) and Nova Scotia. In 1803, Lord Thomas Douglas, 5th Earl of Selkirk, who was sympathetic to the plight of the dispossessed crofters (tenant farmers in the Highlands), brought 800 colonists to Prince Edward Island. In 1811, he founded the Red River Colony as a Scottish colonization project on an area of 300,000 square kilometres (120,000 sq mi) in what would later be the province of Manitoba — land that was granted by the Hudson's Bay Company, in what is referred to as the Selkirk Concession.

Prince Edward Island (PEI) was also heavily influenced by Scottish Gaelic settlers. One prominent settler in PEI was John MacDonald of Glenaladale, who conceived the idea of sending Gaels to Nova Scotia on a grand scale after Culloden. The name Macdonald still dominates on the island, which received a large influx of settlers, predominantly Catholics from the Highlands, in the late 18th century. Another large group of Gaels arrived in 1803. This migration, primarily from the Isle of Skye, was organized by the Earl of Selkirk.

New Brunswick became the home for many Scots. In 1761, a Highland regiment garrisoned Fort Frederick. The surrounding lands surveyed by Captain Bruce in 1762 attracted many Scottish traders when William Davidson of Caithness arrived to settle two years later. Their numbers were swelled by the arrival of thousands of loyalists of Scottish origin both during and after the American Revolution.

One of the New Brunswick and Canada's most famous regiments was "The King's First American Regiment" founded in 1776. It was composed mostly of Highlanders, many of whom fought with their traditional kilts to the sound of bagpipes. The regiment distinguished itself when it defeated Washington's forces at the Battle of Brandywine. When it disbanded after the War, most of its members settled in New Brunswick. A continual influx of immigrants from Scotland and Ulster meant that by 1843, there were over 30,000 Scots in New Brunswick.

Canadian Gaelic was spoken as the first language in much of "Anglophone" Canada, such as Nova Scotia, Prince Edward Island, and Glengarry County in Ontario. Gaelic was the third most commonly spoken language in Canada.

== Demography ==
Canadians of Scottish descent total population (1871−2016)
Note1: 1981 Canadian census did not include multiple ethnic origin responses, thus population is an undercount.
Note2: 1996-present census populations are undercounts, due to the creation of the "Canadian" ethnic origin category.
Canadians of Scottish descent percentage of the total population (1871−2016)
Note1: 1981 Canadian census did not include multiple ethnic origin responses, thus population is an undercount.
Note2: 1996-present census populations are undercounts, due to the creation of the "Canadian" ethnic origin category.

=== Population ===
Scottish Canadian Population History 1871−2016
Year	Population	% of total population
1871	549,946	15.777%
1881	699,863	16.183%
1901	800,154	14.897%
1911	1,027,015	14.251%
1921	1,173,625	13.355%
1931	1,346,350	12.975%
1941	1,403,974	12.201%
1951	1,547,470	11.046%
1961	1,902,302	10.43%
1971	1,720,390	7.976%
1981	1,415,200	5.876%
1986	3,918,055	15.658%
1991	4,248,365	15.738%
1996	4,260,840	14.936%
2001	4,157,210	14.026%
2006	4,354,155	13.937%
2011	4,714,970	14.352%
2016	4,799,005	13.926%
2021	4,392,200	12.09%

=== Religion ===
Scottish Canadian demography by religion
Religious group	2021 (Note: Religious breakdown proportions based on "Scottish" ethnic or cultural origin response on the 2021 census.)		2001 (Note: Religious breakdown proportions based on "Scottish" ethnic or cultural origin response on the 2001 census.)	
Religious group	Pop.	%	Pop.	%
Christianity	2,268,845	51.66%	3,212,175	77.27%
Islam	4,220	0.1%	2,345	0.06%
Irreligion	2,051,670	46.71%	909,770	21.88%
Judaism	11,220	0.26%	8,660	0.21%
Buddhism	8,180	0.19%	6,590	0.16%
Hinduism	970	0.02%	710	0.02%
Indigenous spirituality	3,960	0.09%	4,250	0.1%
Sikhism	425	0.01%	570	0.01%
Other	42,720	0.97%	12,145	0.29%
Total Scottish Canadian population	4,392,200	100%	4,157,215	100%

Scottish Canadian demography by Christian sects
Religious group	2021		2001	
Religious group	Pop.	%	Pop.	%
Catholic	756,715	33.35%	890,835	27.73%
Orthodox	9,735	0.43%	7,645	0.24%
Protestant	1,196,640	52.74%	2,195,440	68.35%
Other Christian	305,755	13.48%	118,255	3.68%
Total Scottish Canadian Christian population	2,268,845	100%	3,212,175	100%

== Geographical distribution ==
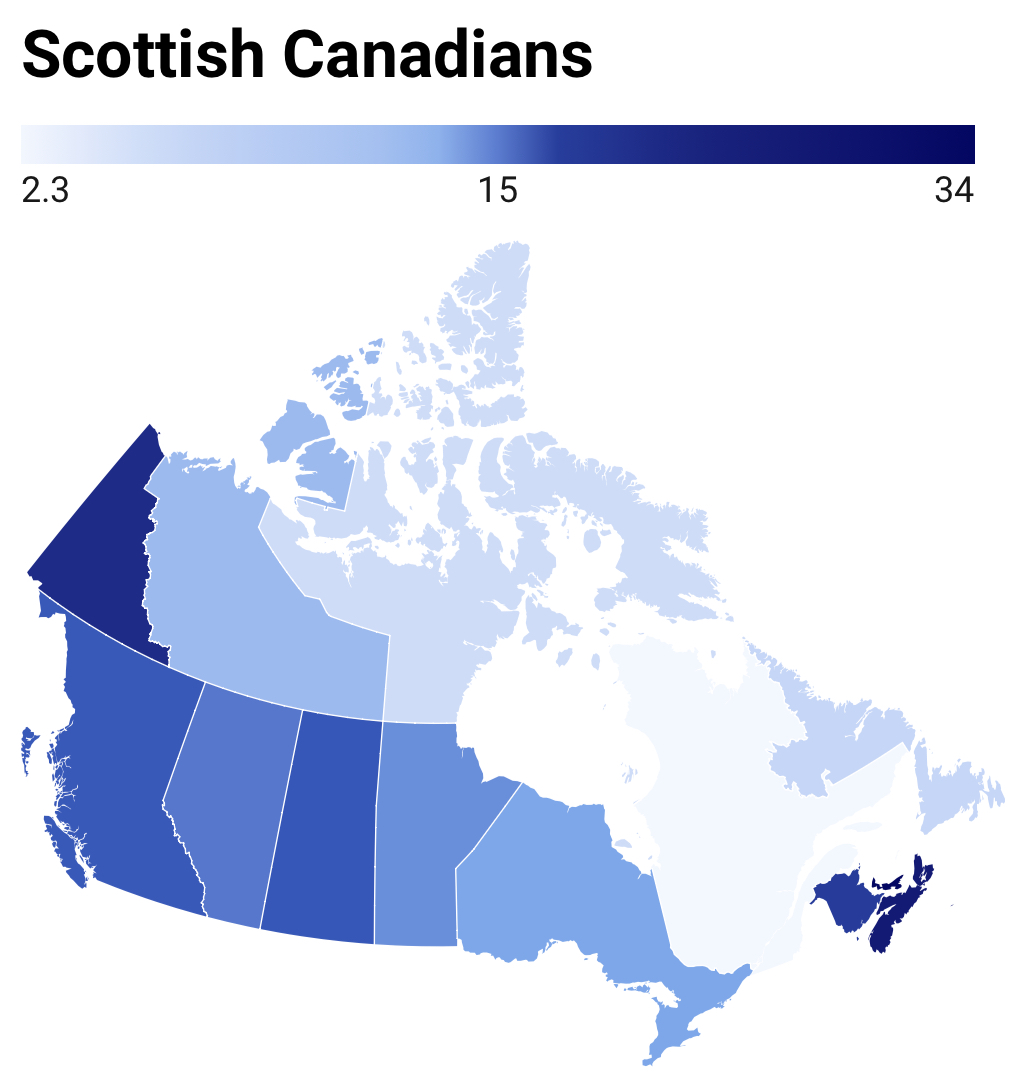
Scottish percent in Canada by province/territory, 2021 census

Scottish Canadians by province and territory (2001−2016)
Province/Territory	2016		2011		2006		2001	
Province/Territory	Pop.	%	Pop.	%	Pop.	%	Pop.	%
Ontario	2,107,295	15.91%	2,080,545	16.44%	2,101,100	17.47%	1,843,110	16.33%
British Columbia	860,775	18.88%	833,290	19.27%	828,145	20.33%	748,905	19.36%
Alberta	704,200	17.7%	670,955	18.8%	661,265	20.31%	556,575	18.92%
Nova Scotia	272,880	30.04%	282,805	31.21%	288,180	31.91%	263,060	29.31%
Quebec	215,025	2.7%	196,670	2.54%	202,515	2.72%	156,140	2.19%
Manitoba	208,060	16.77%	210,815	17.95%	209,170	18.45%	195,570	17.72%
Saskatchewan	193,330	18.06%	190,450	18.88%	182,790	19.16%	172,300	17.89%
New Brunswick	134,455	18.4%	146,230	19.87%	142,560	19.81%	127,635	17.73%
Prince Edward Island	50,685	36.29%	53,960	39.28%	54,290	40.45%	50,700	38.01%
Newfoundland and Labrador	34,650	6.76%	32,810	6.47%	34,925	6.98%	30,295	5.96%
Yukon	8,295	23.63%	8,340	25.03%	7,005	23.2%	6,245	21.89%
Northwest Territories	6,090	14.8%	5,685	13.93%	5,875	14.31%	5,190	13.99%
Nunavut	3,265	9.18%	2,420	7.64%	2,025	6.91%	1,475	5.53%
Canada	4,799,005	13.93%	4,714,970	14.35%	4,719,850	15.11%	4,157,210	14.03%

=== Nova Scotia ===
The flag of Nova Scotia

The Scots have influenced the cultural mix of Nova Scotia for centuries and constitute the largest ethnic group in the province, at 29.3% of its population. The name of Nova Scotia literally means "New Scotland" in Latin, and its flag was designed as a combination of the Scottish Saltire and the Royal Arms of Scotland.

Nova Scotia was briefly colonized by Scottish settlers in 1620, although by 1624 the Scottish settlers had been removed by treaty and the area was turned over to the French until the middle of the 18th century. Scottish settlement greatly accelerated during the resettlement of Loyalists in Nova Scotia following the end of the American revolutionary war, and especially following the Highland Clearances in Scotland.

The Gaelic influences of Scottish immigrants continue to play an important role in defining the cultural life of the province, especially in its music. According to the 2006 census about 900 Nova Scotians are fluent in Gaelic languages (the census does not distinguish between Scottish Gaelic/Canadian Gaelic and Irish Gaelic), and about 6,015 in all of Canada. However, the Nova Scotian Office of Gaelic Affairs estimates there are currently around 2000 Scottish Gaelic speakers in the province and notes the enduring impact of institutions such as the Gaelic College in Cape Breton.

Dalhousie University in Halifax, the largest university in the Maritime provinces, was founded in 1818 by Scottish aristocrat George Ramsay as the only Gaelic college in Canada. St. Francis Xavier University in Antigonish was also founded by a Scot — Colin Francis MacKinnon, a Catholic bishop.

Murdoch (1998) notes that the popular image of Cape Breton Island as a last bastion of Gaelic culture distorts the complex history of the island since the 16th century. The original Micmac inhabitants, Acadian French, Irish, Loyalists from New England, Lowland Scots and English have all contributed to a history which has included cultural, religious, and political conflict as well as cooperation and synthesis. The Highland Scots became the largest community in the early 19th century, and their heritage in music, folklore, and language has survived government indifference, but it is now threatened by a synthetic marketable 'tartan clan doll culture' aimed primarily at tourists.

Flag of Montreal

=== Quebec ===
Scots have long and historic ties with the province of Quebec. The early Scots who arrived in the province were crofters and fishermen. When the Don de Dieu sailed up the St. Lawrence River during the first wave of colonization of French Canada, it was piloted by a Scot, Abraham Martin. The first British governor of Quebec was also a Scot, James Murray. He received the keys to the city gates from the French commander, Major de Ramezay, who was himself of Scottish descent, as many Scots had been employed by the French since the time of the Auld Alliance.

Large groups of Scots, chiefly from Ross-shire, arrived on the ship Nephton in 1802 to settle in Quebec. Many of their descendants have become prominent in the business, financial and religious activities of Montreal. Many early settlers from Tryon County, New York came here, in what was then wilderness. They were joined by many Highlanders during the Revolution, and after the War had ended, by a whole regiment of the "King's Royals."

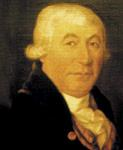
James McGill

McGill University was founded in 1821 with revenue from the estate bequeathed by James McGill, a merchant and politician who had emigrated from Glasgow. Its first head was Scotsman John Bethune, a pupil of Strachan (who was prevented from assuming the position only by a delay in its foundation). Another wealthy Scot, Peter Redpath, was responsible for financing the museum, the library and a university chair.

=== Ontario ===
Glengarry County in modern day-Ontario is a historic region with much Scottish or Gaelic background. This is because it is the site of where many Gaels settled after the Highland Clearances. Scottish Gaelic / Canadian Gaelic is a spoken language in the county, but the number of speakers has declined to a great degree. Maxville Public School in Maxville, Glengarry still offers the language. Also known in the region are the Glengarry Highland Games where many Scottish competitions are held to celebrate Scottish Culture. The chief Scottish town in Glengarry was Cornwall, located in modern-day Ontario. It was reinforced in 1786 when the ship McDonald arrived at Quebec from Greenock with 520 new pioneers. Soon immigrants came from all parts of Scotland to make it one of the most important Scots-Canadian communities. The Glengarry clansmen managed to get away from their homelands before the British Government's embargo during the war with Napoleon. Many other retired officials from the Hudson's Bay Company joined the Glengarry Settlements. Another famous Scottish area that came to exert great influence in Ontario was the Perth Settlement, another region of Scottish and military origin. Unemployment and suffering following the end of the Napoleonic Wars caused the British government to reverse its former policies and actively encourage emigration. In 1815, three loaded transports set sail from Greenock for Upper Canada: the Atlas, the Baptiste Merchant and the Borothy. After the War of 1812 ended, many soldiers from the disbanded regiments joined them. In 1816, some Scots-Irish from Ulster arrived in the area. Many Perth families became prominent in both provincial and national governments.

An educational institution of Scottish origin is Queen's University in Kingston "the Aberdeen of Canada". Numerous educational institutions have Scottish influence, one being Sir John A. Macdonald Collegiate Institute, a secondary school located in Toronto, Ontario. The crest contains a map of Canada and the symbols of the Macdonald clan: a white coronet, a mailed fist, and crossed crosslets. Red, Royal Purple, and White, which predominate in the tartan of Sir John's family clan, Clanranald.

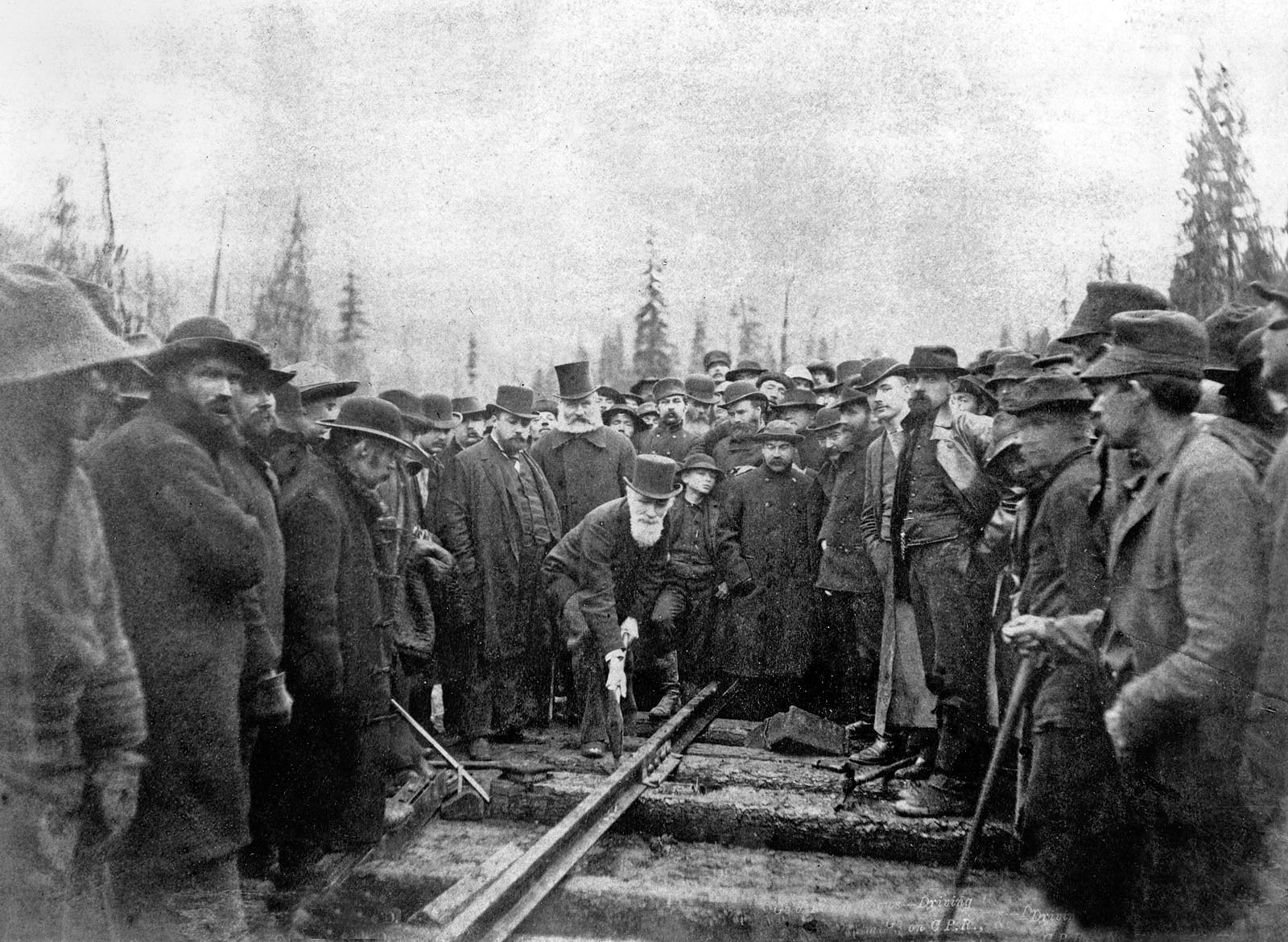
Lord Strathcona drives the last spike of the Canadian Pacific Railway at Craigellachie, November 7, 1885.

=== British Columbia ===
Owing to the role that the Hudson's Bay Company, a company dominated by a Scottish managerial class, played in the colonial settlement of British Columbia, many of the leading early colonial officials were Scottish or of Scottish descent such as Sir James Douglas (whose father was from Scotland), William Fraser Tolmie, and John Ross.

Scottish influence has been an important part of the cultural mix both in metropolitan Vancouver and wider British Columbian society. The St. Andrew's and Caledonian Society of Vancouver, for example, was founded in 1886, the same year as the city. On St. Andrew's Day, 1887, the society held a grand St. Andrew's Ball in McDonough Hall at the southeast corner of Hastings and Columbia and almost half the city's population attended. The city still celebrates Scottish Heritage week which concludes with the BC Highland Games.

In Victoria, two of the city's most recognizable landmarks, Craigdarroch Castle and Hatley Castle, were commissioned by the Scottish-born Dunsmuir family, whose coal-baron patriarch Robert Dunsmuir immigrated from Scotland to become one of Vancouver Island's richest businessmen. These two castles brought Scottish Baronial architecture to very prominent landmarks in Victoria, both of which have been designated as National Historic Sites for their significance to the city. Robert's son James Dunsmuir would go on to become the Premier of British Columbia, and later the Lieutenant Governor General.

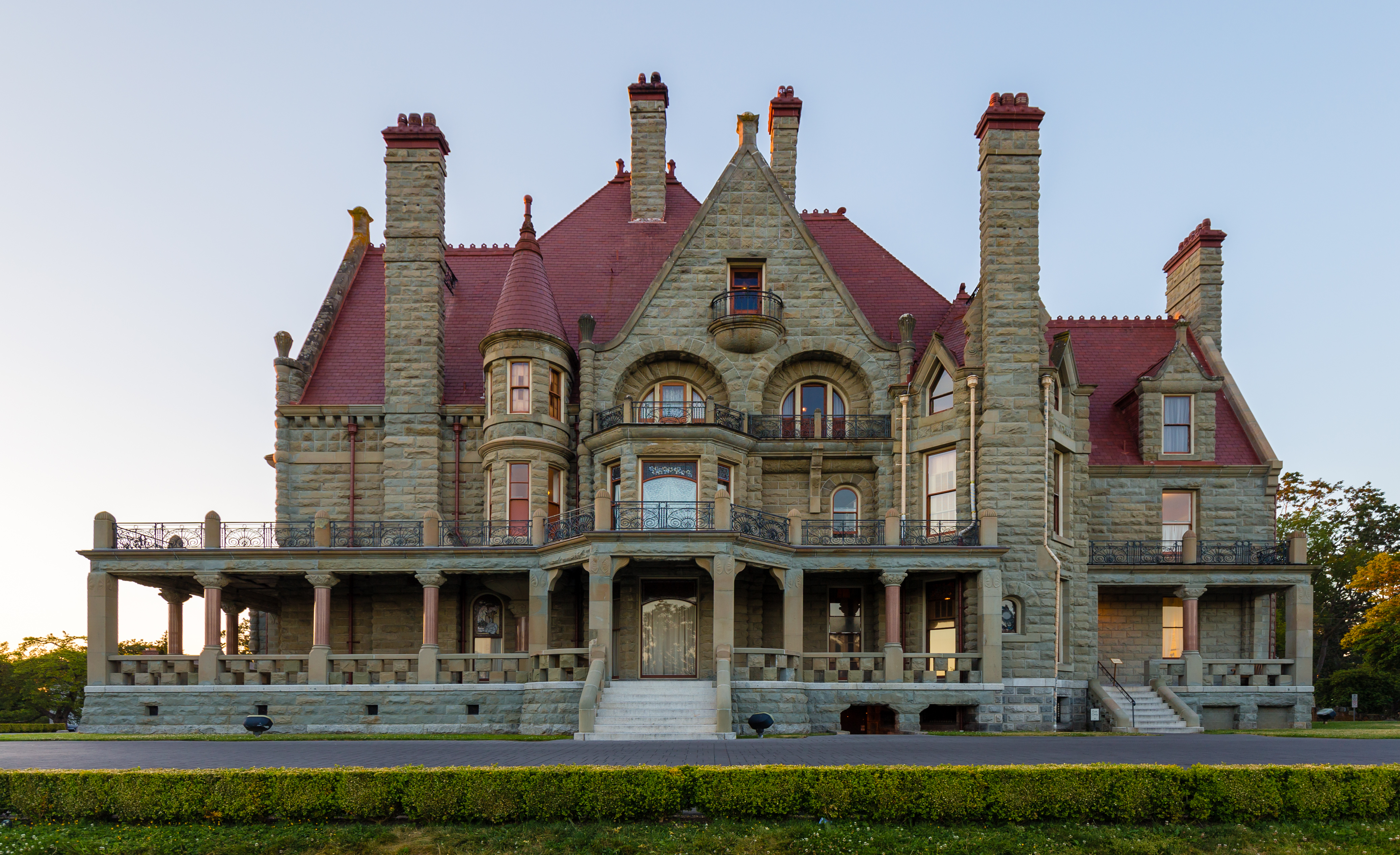
Craigdarroch Castle in Victoria, an example of Scottish Baronial architecture in Canada

Many local place names in Vancouver are of Scottish origin. The district of Dollarton, for example, was named for Captain Robert Dollar. West Vancouver's first European settler, John Lawson, planted holly by the side of the "burn" or river flowing across his property; he coined "Hollyburn" as the name for his place. Iona Island was formerly called McMillan Island, after a Scottish settler named Donald McMillan. Part of West Vancouver is named after Dundarave Castle in Scotland. In 1905, at what is now West 41st Avenue in Vancouver, a young Scottish couple who had recently settled in the district with the last name MacKinnon were invited to name the new station. Mrs. MacKinnon was asked by the British Columbia Electric Railway manager R.H. Sterling to name the interurban tram stop at Wilson Road (today West 41st Avenue). She chose to call it "Kerry's Dale", after the name of her family home, Kerrydale, in Gairloch, Scotland. Kerrysdale means "little seat of the fairies." It was quickly corrupted to Kerrisdale.

Other evidence of the Scottish influence on the development of British Columbia can be found in the names of streets, parks, creeks and other geographical features throughout the province, the most notable of which are the Fraser River and Mount Douglas (PKOLS).

== Culture ==
Today Canada is awash in Scottish memorabilia, as Rae (2005) shows. The Tartan days, clan gatherings, highland games, and showings of films like Braveheart indicate a sense of Scottishness that is informed by stories, narratives, or myths of the homeland's rural, masculinist, resistant past.

Other Canadians reject tartanism as a superficial and commercialized expression of Gaelic identity, and embrace Scottish Gaelic language and culture through the auspices of organizations such as the Atlantic Gaelic Academy and the Gaelic College. The Comhairle na Gàidhlig is an organization devoted to "creating an environment that makes Nova Scotia a place where Gaelic language, culture, and communities thrive."

== Provincial and territorial tartans ==
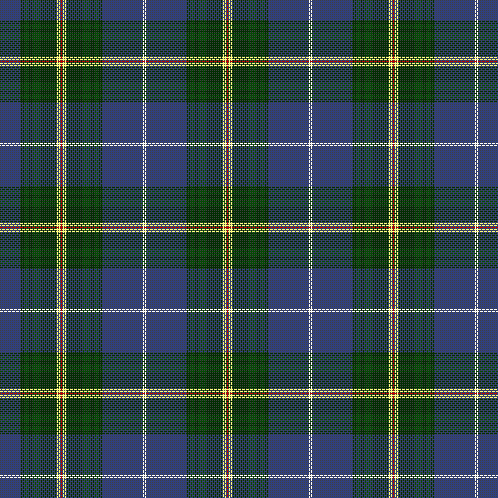
The tartan of Nova Scotia is the first official provincial tartan in Canada.

Every province and territory has an officially recognized tartan, except for Quebec, whose tartan is unofficial, and Nunavut, which has no tartan. Tartans were first brought to Canada by Scottish settlers, and the first province to officially adopt a tartan was Nova Scotia in 1955. Several of the tartans are registered in the books of the Court of the Lord Lyon, King of Arms of Scotland.

== Notable Scottish-Canadians ==
The list of Scots who influenced Canada's history is indeed a long one. The explorer Alexander MacKenzie completed the first known transcontinental crossing of America north of Mexico. John Sandfield Macdonald (1812–1872) became Premier of the Province of Canada in 1862 and the first Premier of Ontario in 1867. Sir John A. Macdonald (1815–1891), who emigrated in 1820, became the first Prime Minister of the Dominion of Canada, leading the country through its period of early growth. Under his leadership, the dominion expanded to include Manitoba, British Columbia and Prince Edward Island.

Alexander Mackenzie was the first Liberal Prime Minister of Canada (1873–78). Another Scot, William Lyon Mackenzie, who led the revolt in Upper Canada against the colonial government in 1838, became a symbol of Canadian radicalism. His rebellion dramatized the need to reform the colony's outmoded constitution and led to the 1841 union of Upper Canada and Lower Canada. Another Scot, William McDougall, was known as one of the fathers of the Confederation; Sir Richard McBride (1870–1917) was from 1903 to 1915 the Premier of British Columbia, where his was the first government under the new system of political parties. McBride was also known for his tireless work on behalf of the extension of the Pacific Great Eastern Railroad, which was to bind British Columbia together the way the CPR had Canada..

In the early 20th century, William Lyon Mackenzie King (1874–1950) was a leading Canadian politician very proud of his Scots background. King was three time Prime Minister of Canada, doing much to help preserve the unity of the French and English populations in his vast country, and particularly revered in Britain for his contribution to the allied cause in World War II. The first full-time Minister of Labour, King was the leader of the Liberal Party for over 30 years. His last term as prime minister was from 1935 to 1948.

Tommy Douglas, CCF Member of Parliament (1935–44), CCF Premier of Saskatchewan (1944–1961), federal NDP leader (1961–68), and NDP Member of Parliament (1962–1979) was born in Scotland. Best remembered as the father of Canadian medicare, he was voted the Greatest Canadian in a 2004 TV poll.

Established as one of the major ethnic components of the Canadian population during the period 1815–1870, Scots dominated in many areas other than education and politics. Economic affairs also took their interest, and they largely controlled the trade in furs, timber, banking and railroad management. Almost one-quarter of Canada's industrial leaders in the 1920s had been born in Scotland, and another quarter had Scottish-born fathers.

The Scots had a long tradition of struggle to maintain a separate identity in the face of a simultaneous pressure to integrate into a foreign society. Thus over the years, they had gained considerable experience in the ambivalence of being both accommodating and distinctive. Substantial numbers of Scots continued to immigrate to Canada after 1870. The early 20th century saw a great boom in the numbers leaving Scotland for Canada. As one of many ethnic groups in Canada, the Scots have managed to retain their separate identity, as well as adopting other religious practices such as deism.

== See also ==
- British Canadians
- Scottish diaspora
- Scottish placenames in Canada
- Scots-Quebecer
- Anglo-Métis
- English Canadians
- European Canadians
- Scottish people
- Scottish Americans
- Ulster-Scottish Canadians
- Celtic music in Canada
- Glengarry Highland Games
