= Athol, Ontario =

Athol, Ontario can mean the following places:

- Athol Bay, Prince Edward County, Ontario
- Athol, an unincorporated place north of Maxville, Ontario
