= BC Highland Games =

ScotFestBC: The British Columbia Highland Games
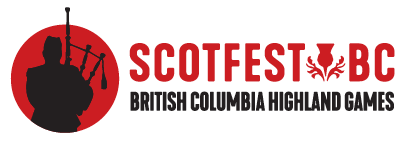
- Genre: Highland games
- Dates: June 14 & 15, 2024
- Locations: Town Centre Park, Coquitlam, BC.
- Years active: 1931-present
- Website: ScotFestBC.com

ScotFestBC: The British Columbia Highland Games is the second oldest continually running Highland Games in British Columbia, Canada. The games are run by the ScotFestBC Organizing Committee as a program of the United Scottish Cultural Society of Vancouver. The 2024 Games will be held at Town Centre Park on June 14 & 15, 2024 in Coquitlam. This will be the 92nd annual Games.

The British Columbia Highland Games is a traditional Scottish highland games, with competitive athletics, music and dancing. The Games include Scottish heavy events (caber tossing), pipe bands and solo piping competitions, Highland Dancing, whisky school, cultural workshops, Scottish Clan displays, Scottish country dancing, Celtic artisans, kids activities, live Celtic entertainment, beer service and massed pipe bands at end of day.

Traditional events include:

- Solo Piping
- Solo Drumming
- Pipe Bands
- Performance Pipe Bands
- Highland Dancing
- Whisky tasting
- Educational workshops
- Friday night events
- Children's activities
- Celtic Yoga
- Heavy Events, which include:
  - Stone put
  - Weight throw
  - Scottish hammer throw
  - Weight over the bar
  - Sheaf toss
  - Caber toss
  - Farmers walk
- Piobaireachd competition
- Beer service
- Food & merchandise vendors
- Main stage entertainers/performers
