= Mid-Maryland Celtic Festival =

Scottish festival held in the United States

- Genre: Celtic music
- Dates: Second Saturday each May
- Location: Mount Airy, Maryland
- Years active: 1999–2019, 2021–
- Website: http://www.midmarylandcelticfestival.com/

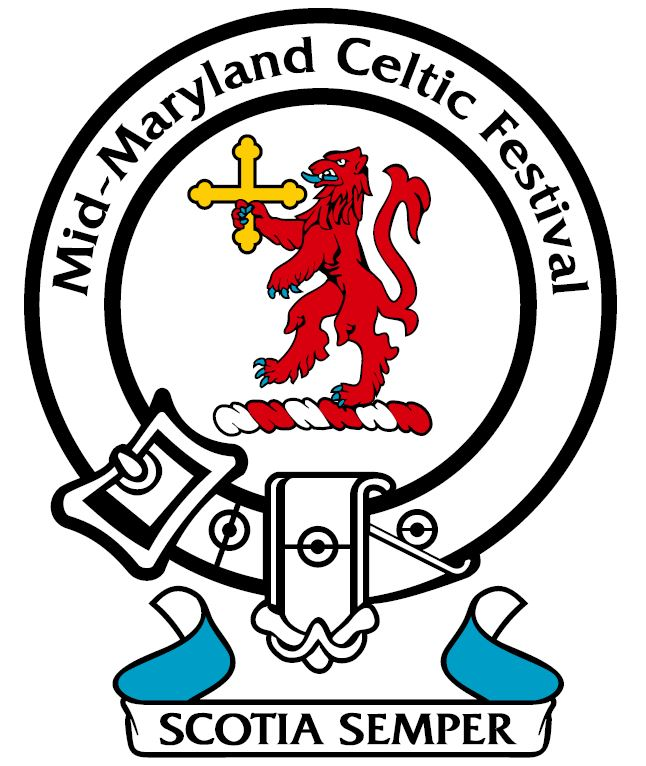
Mid-Maryland Celtic Festival

The Mid-Maryland Celtic Festival (formerly the Frederick Celtic Festival) is a one-day festival celebrating all things Scottish, held annually in Mt. Airy, Maryland, United States.

The festival features kilted professional and amateur Highland Games athletes competing for victory tossing cabers and throwing heavy weights. Other activities include Celtic music, competitions, bagpipe playing, crafts, vendors, Scottish and Irish dancing, and free genealogy services.

Historically held in Urbana and Frederick (MD), starting in 2012 the festival is held annually on the second Saturday each May at the Mt. Airy Fire Department Fairgrounds which are located at 1003 Twin Arch Road, Mt. Airy, MD 21771. Festival hours are 9 am to 6 pm and now have been expanded to include a British car show co-sponsored by the Clustered Spires British Car Club of Frederick, MD and expanded dog/herding events.

There was no festival in 2020.
