= Brazilian Scottish Highland Games =

Annual sporting event

The Brazilian Scottish Highland Games is an annual Highland games event held in Rio Grande do Sul, Brazil.

It consists of a series of traditional Scottish competitions.

== Events ==
Traditional competitions:

- Caber toss
- Stone put
- Hammer throw
- Tug of war

== List of Games ==
Brazilian Scottish Highland Games
Games	Year	Name	Dates	Competitors
I	2011	Blood, sweat and mud	26 November	
II	2012	Legends of blood	1–2 September	118
III	2013	The glory's conquest	14–15 December	90
IV	2014	Winter Battles	12–13 July	119
V	2015	Challenge of the Gods		
VI	2016	Clans of the storm		
VII	2017	Union of the clans		
V	2018		242	
