= Highland games =

Scottish games

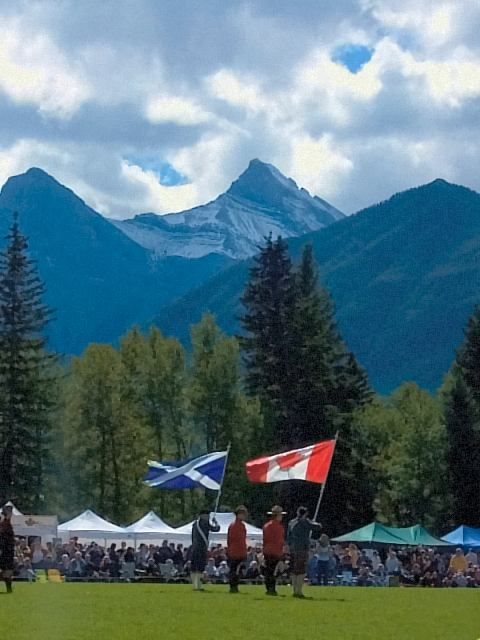
Opening ceremonies of 2004 Canmore Highland games

Highland games (Scottish Gaelic: geamannan Gàidhealach) is a competitive strength sport with events held in spring and summer in Scotland and several other countries with a large Scottish diaspora as a way of celebrating Scottish and Celtic culture, especially that of the Scottish Highlands. Certain aspects of the games are so well known as to have become emblematic of Scotland, such as the bagpipes, the kilt, and the heavy events, especially the stone put, Scottish hammer throw, weight throw, weight over bar, caber toss, keg toss and sheaf toss. While centred on competitions in piping and drumming, dancing, and Scottish heavy athletics, the games also include entertainment and exhibits related to other aspects of Scottish and Gaelic cultures.

The Cowal Highland Gathering, better known as the Cowal Games, is held in Dunoon, Scotland, every August. It is the largest Highland games in Scotland, (Note: Cowal Highland Gathering can be verified as the world's largest highland games on the Official Scottish Tourist Board Website at VisitScotland.com.) attracting around 3,500 competitors and somewhere in the region of 23,000 spectators from around the globe. Worldwide, however, it is exceeded in terms of spectators by three gatherings in the United States: the estimated 30,000 that attend Grandfather Mountain in North Carolina; the New Hampshire Highland Games & Festival, which attracts over 35,000 annually; and the even larger Northern California gathering—the largest in the Northern Hemisphere—that has taken place every year since 1866. This event, the Scottish Highland Gathering and Games, is currently held on Labor Day weekend in Pleasanton, California; and the sesquicentennial event was held on 5–6 September 2015, attracting a record crowd close to 50,000.

Highland games are claimed to have influenced Baron Pierre de Coubertin when he was planning the revival of the Olympic Games. De Coubertin saw a display of Highland games at the Paris Exhibition of 1889. (Note: The website of the International Wrestling Association reports rather more expansively on the role of the 1889 Paris event and its effect on the development of the Olympics, considering it to have had a "huge impact" on world sport. An article published in 2004 in the Christian Science Monitor points to two other events, including that of Much Wenlock, a small English village in Shropshire.)

== History ==
=== Ancient games ===
The first historical reference to the type of events held at Highland games in Scotland was made during the time of King Malcolm III (Scottish Gaelic: Máel Coluim, c. 1031 – 13 November 1093) when he summoned men to race up Craig Choinnich overlooking Braemar with the aim of finding the fastest runner in Scotland to be his royal messenger. There is a document from 1703 summoning the clan of the Laird of Grant, Clan Grant. They were to arrive wearing Highland coats and "also with gun, sword, pistol and dirk". (Note: As quoted on the history page of the Aboyne Highland Gathering website.) From this letter, it is surmised that the competitions would have included feats of arms. There are also thought to have been events where the strongest and bravest soldiers in Scotland would be tested. Musicians and dancers were encouraged to reveal their skill and talents and so be a great credit to the clan that they represented. Some modern sources suggest more these games would originate from the deer hunts that the inhabitants of the Highlands engaged in.

Attempts have been made to discover earlier traditions of games, although evidence is thin. The primary sources are from the bardic traditions of both contests between clans and of tests to select retainers for clan chiefs. An example of a possible early games venue is at Fetteresso.

=== Modern games ===
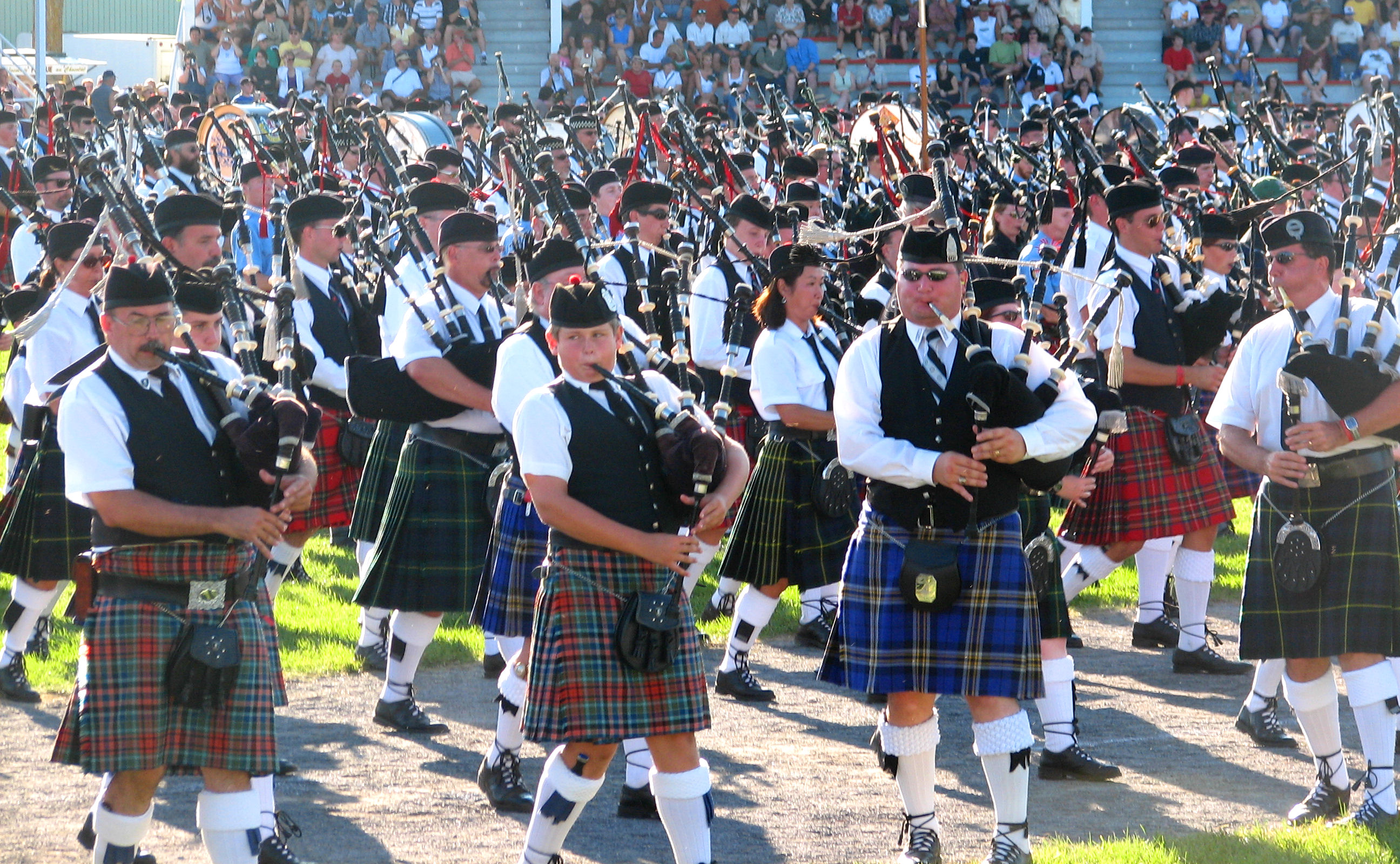
Massed bands at the Glengarry Highland Games, Maxville, Ontario, Canada, 2006

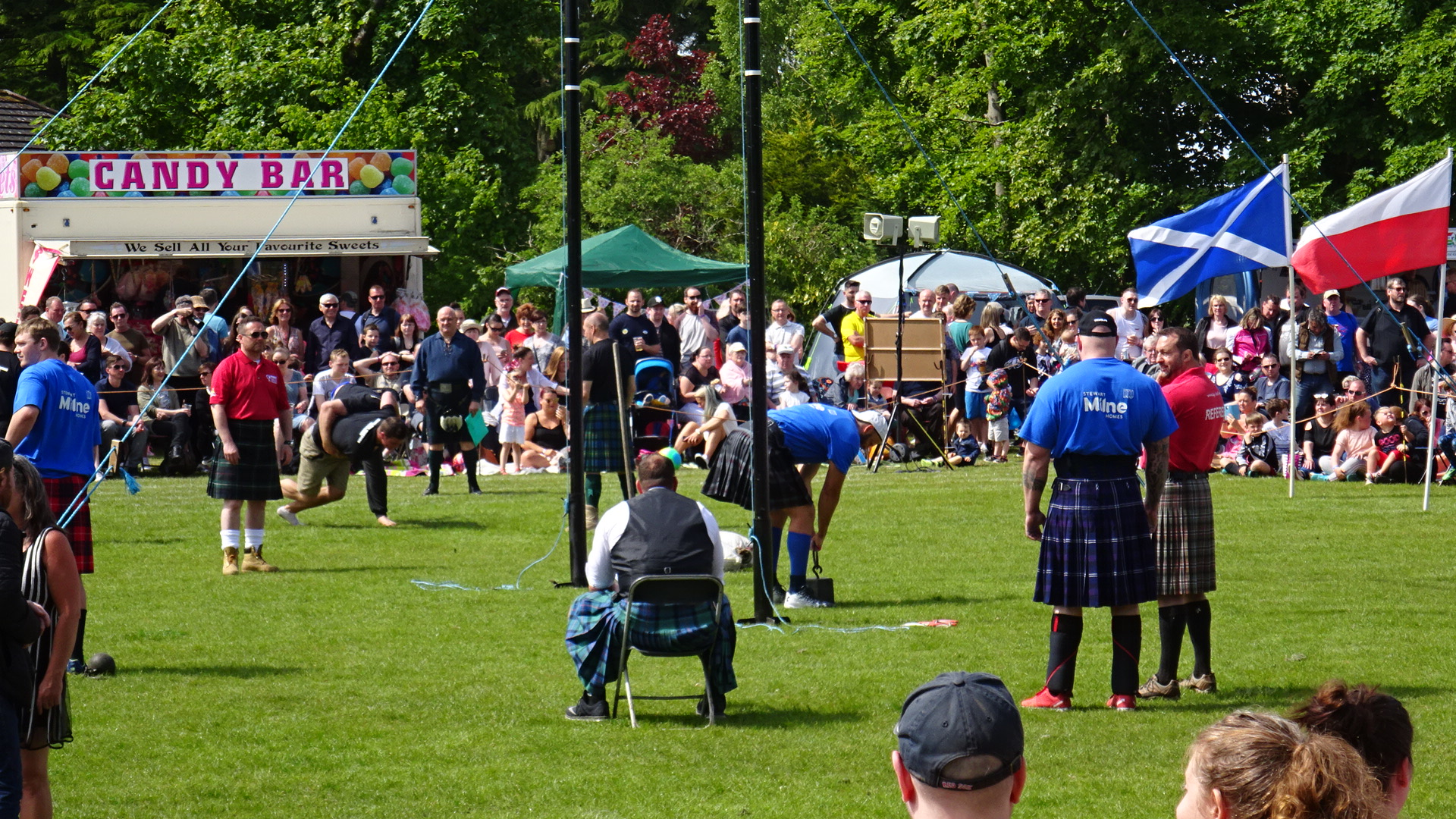
Weight over the bar event at the Carmunnock Highland Games, Scotland

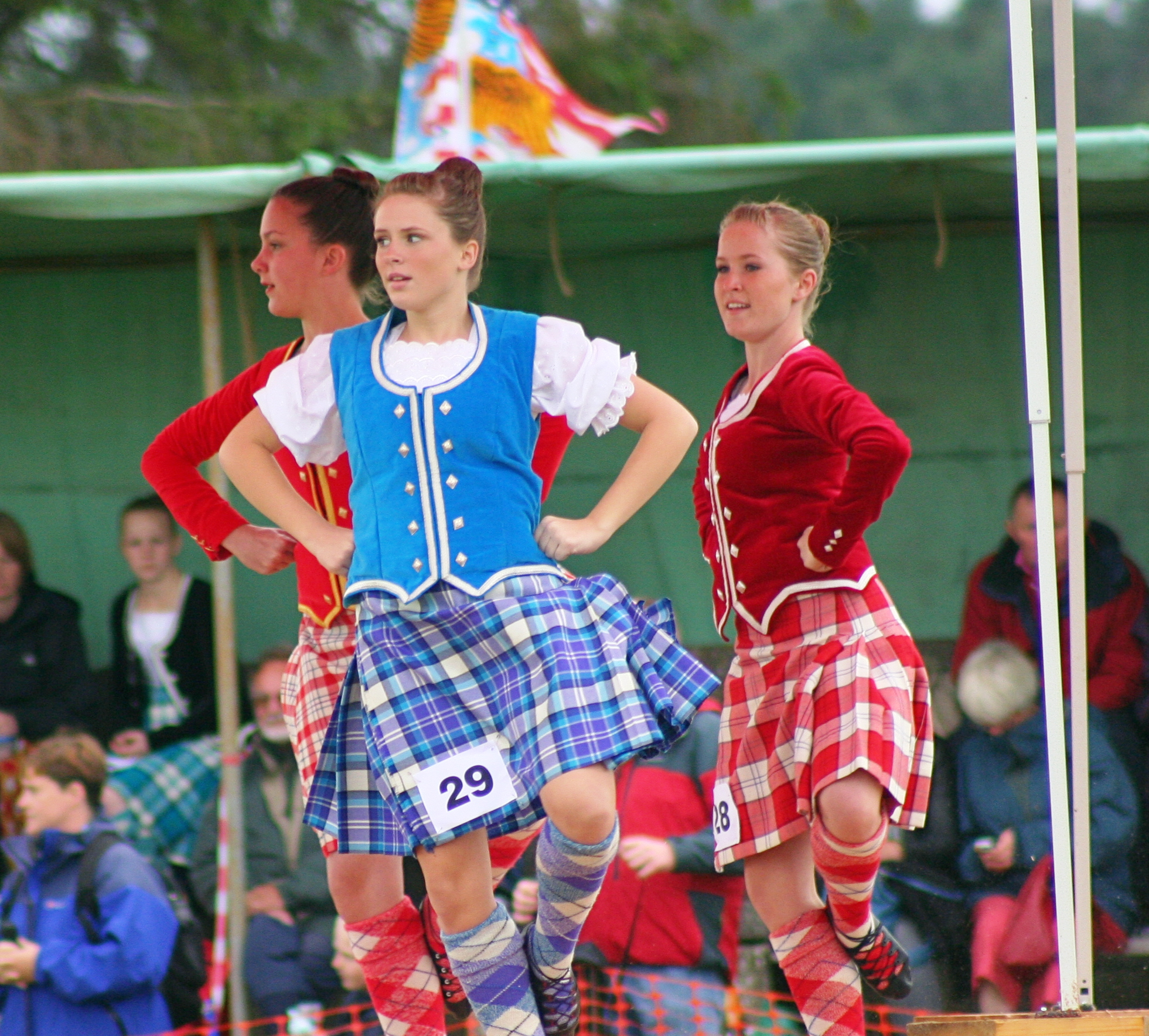
Highland Dancing Competition at the Dornoch Highland Gathering, Scotland

The modern Highland games are largely a 19th-century development, from the period following the Jacobite rebellions and subsequent ban on Highland dress. (Note: The Dress Act 1746 was part of the Act of Proscription 1746.)

By the mid-20th century, annual Highland games events, modelled on the traditional events in Scotland along with some elements borrowed from the mòd festivals, had been established not just in Scotland but throughout the United States, Canada, Australia, New Zealand, and South Africa, among other places with a notable Scottish diaspora, which totals about 50 million people worldwide. (The earliest such events in North America go back quite a way, to 1836 in New York and at least 1863 in Nova Scotia.) The modern, rather commercialised gatherings have done much to promote tartan, kilts, and other elements of Highland culture abroad, having up to tens of thousands of attendees, a large proportion of them in Highland dress. The games are the primary source of business for a cottage industry of professional kiltmakers outside of Scotland, and are the main recruiting grounds of the numerous clan societies. (Note: Armstrong (2017) quoted a US-based clan association organiser thus: "without Scottish Clans & Families and our oft criticised tartan, bagpipes, musty castles, clan battles and inspiring heroes the national Scottish brand becomes somewhat indistinguishable from countless other nations".)

While the Scottish Highland Games Association says there are dozens of such events in Scotland, there were at least 260 annual Highland games events worldwide as of 2000, more than 100 of them in the US alone, and dozens more in Canada. They are closely intertwined with bagpipe band competitions (which date to 1781), a lasting source of Highland imagery in their regiment-inspired uniforms; the 2013 World Pipe Band Championships in Glasgow drew over 8,000 pipers and drummers from all over the world.

The games' rather flamboyantly tartaned subculture, a "shortcut to the Highlands", is sustained outside Scotland primarily by multi-generational Scottish descendants rather than by direct Scottish expatriates. Sir Malcolm MacGregor, chief of Clan Gregor and then convenor of the Standing Council of Scottish Chiefs (well aware of tartan's connections to tourism and other Scottish economic interests) wrote in 2016 of the games events beyond Scotland that "it is the stuff of kilts and cabers, but it is the Scotland those not living in Scotland want it to be." Ian Brown (2012) coined the term tartanism (as distinct from tartanry) for this international tokenisation of tartan, kilts, and other symbols of the Highlands as ethnic-identity markers, evolving to some degree independently to suit the cultural needs of the New World Scottish diaspora and unrestrained by the views of the originating Scottish "home" culture. Michael B. Paterson (2001) hypothesises that the fondness for Highland symbols and activities among the diaspora may be due to the European-descended populations in these countries lacking much of a direct experience of culture deeper than a few generations, and being dominated by nuclear family structure; Highland games, clan tartans, Burns suppers, St Andrew's societies (more than 1,200 of them just in the US), etc. provide a sense of shared roots, heritage, identity, and a broader and more elastic notion of family, as well as fostering Old World, "mother country" connections. Fiona K. Armstrong (2017) writes: "It is a feudal longing in a modern age. It is a yearning for some supposedly comforting and ordered past." According to Ian Maitland Hume (2001):

Tartan and the kilt encapsulate many facets of a heritage which people aspire to access; they may also represent a part-mythical family origin for those seeking roots .... The number of Americans who choose to adopt a Scottish element as part of their identity can be attributed in substantial part to the power these symbols possess.

This swell of diasporic tartan enthusiasm seems to have been triggered in the 1950s, the beginning of the age of affordable powered flight, as clan chiefs like Dame Flora MacLeod of Clan MacLeod travelled abroad to promote Scottish tourism and other connections. (At least 1 in 5 Scottish-descended people surveyed in 2017 by VisitScotland, the national tourism board, expressed an interest in travelling to Scotland.) However, in 2009, the US-based Council of Scottish Clans and Associations reported a drop in the number of active clan societies (which peaked at 170, and drive considerable tourism as well as historic-place restoration efforts), with up to a 25% decrease in individual memberships, as well as some of the annual games events coming to an end; "new technology" (i.e. the Internet) seemed to be related.

== Events ==
=== Heavy events ===
In their original form centuries ago, Highland games revolved around athletic and sports competitions. Though other activities were always a part of the festivities, many today still consider Highland athletics to be what the games are all about—in short, that the athletics are the games, and all the other activities are just entertainment. Regardless, it remains true today that the athletic competitions are at least an integral part of the events.

==== Stone put/ putting the heavy stone ====
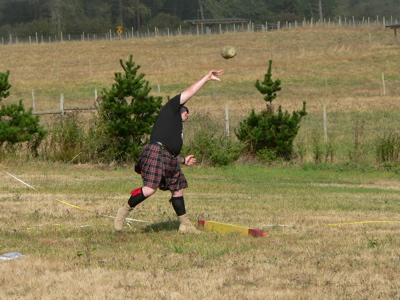
Stone put

Similar to the modern-day shot put as seen in the Olympic Games, instead of a steel shot, a large stone of variable weight is often used. There are two versions, differing in allowable technique: The Braemar Stone uses a 20–30 lb (9.1–13.6 kg) stone for men (13–18 lb or 6–8 kg for women) and does not allow any run up to the toeboard or "trig" to deliver the stone, i.e., it is a standing put. In the Open Stone using a 16–25 lb (7.3–11.4 kg) stone for men (8–12 lb or 3.5–5.5 kg for women), the thrower is allowed to use any throwing style so long as the stone is put with one hand with the stone resting cradled in the neck until the moment of release. Most athletes in the open stone use either "glide" or "spin" technique.

==== Scottish hammer throw ====
This event is seen as the precursor to the modern hammer throw seen in track and field events worldwide. However the Highland Games version has some differences. In the Scottish event, a round metal ball weighing 16 or 22 lb (7.25 or 10 kg) for men, or 12 or 16 lb (5.5 or 7.25 kg) for women, is attached to the end of a shaft about 4 feet (1.2 metres) in length and made out of wood, bamboo, rattan or plastic. With the feet in a fixed position, the hammer is whirled about one's head and thrown for distance over the shoulder. Hammer throwers sometimes employ specially designed footwear with flat blades to dig into the turf to maintain their balance and resist the centrifugal forces of the implement as it is whirled about the head. It substantially increases the attainable distance.

==== Weight throw/ weight for distance ====
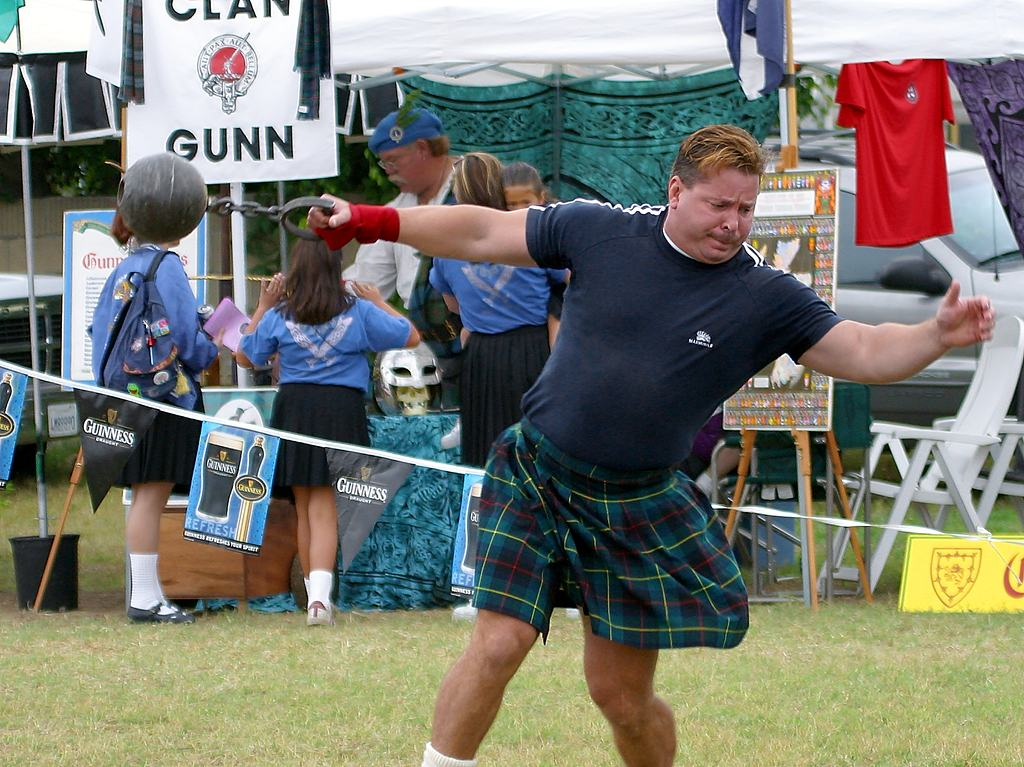
Weight throw

This event has two variations (usually considered two separate events) to it, depending on the weight of the implement. One using a light (28 lb (13 kg) for men and 14 lb (6.4 kg) for women) and the other a heavy (56 lb (25 kg) for men, 42 lb (19 kg) for masters men, and 28 lb (13 kg) for women) weight. The weights are made of metal and have a handle attached either directly or by means of a chain. The implement is thrown using one hand only, but otherwise using any technique. Usually a spinning technique is employed. The longest throw wins.

==== Weight over bar/ weight for height ====
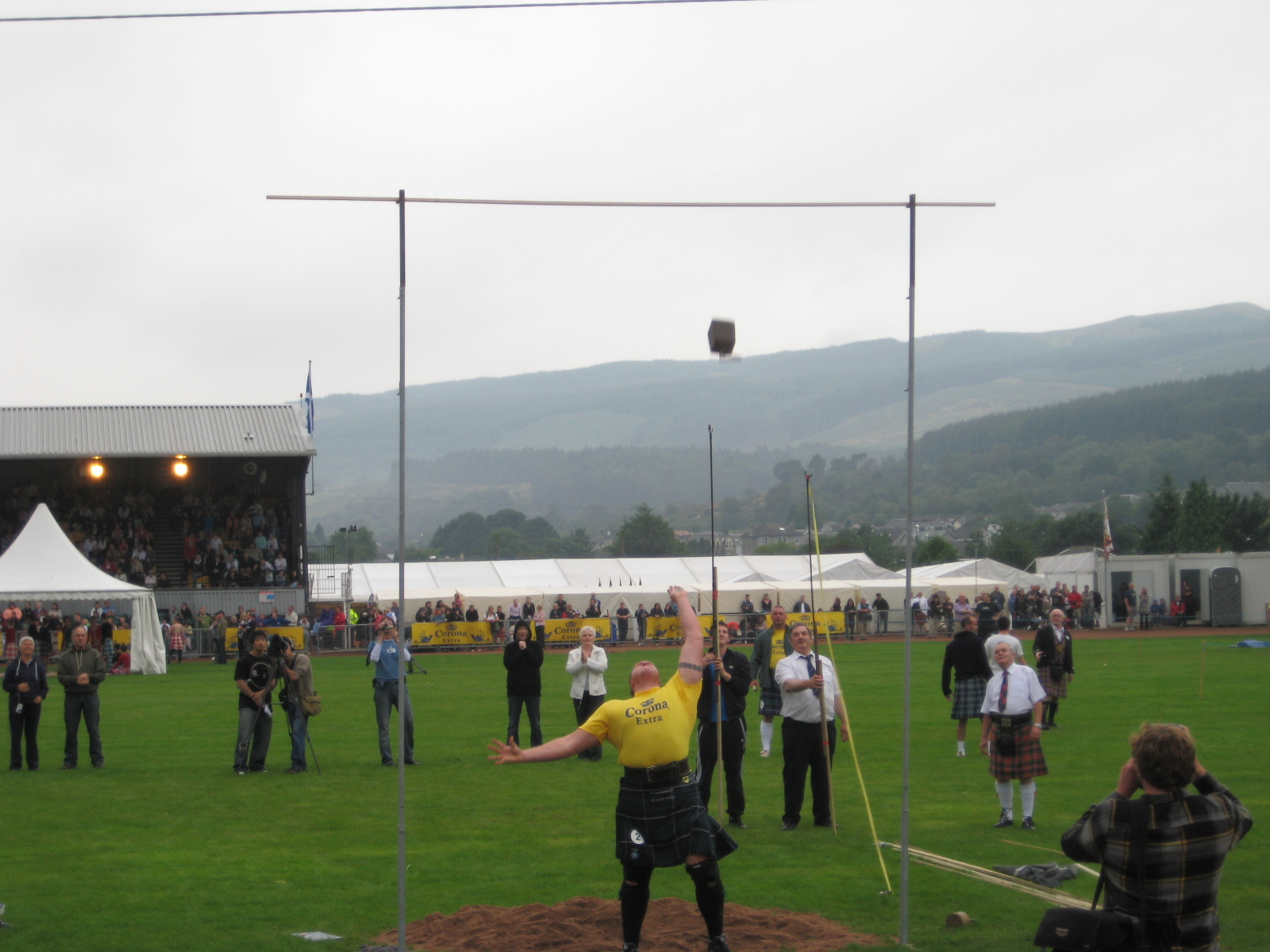
Weight over bar

In this event, the athletes toss either a 25.4 kg (56 lb/ 4-stone) weight for men, 19 kg (42 lb) for masters men, and 12 kg (28 lb) for women, a weight with an attached handle over a horizontal bar using only one hand. It requires the weight to be kept between the legs before swinging it up in a pendulum like manner, and releasing when it is at its apex, directly overhead. Each athlete is allowed three attempts at each height. Successful clearance of the height allows the athlete to advance into the next round at a greater height. The competition is determined by the highest successful toss with fewest misses being used for tie-breakers. It is also used in some Strongman competitions.

==== Caber toss ====
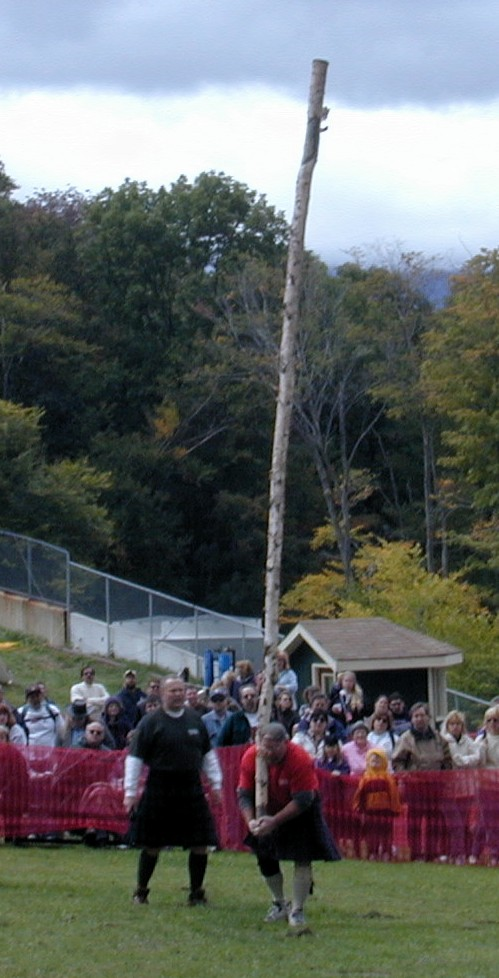
Caber toss

In this staple event, competitors toss a large tapered pole called a "caber" (/ˈkeɪbər/) usually made from a larch tree. The term "caber" derives from the Gaelic word cabar, which refers to a wooden beam. It can be between 16–20 feet (5–6 metres) tall and weigh 90–150 pounds (40–70 kilograms). The primary objective is to toss the caber so that it turns end over end, falling away from the tosser. Ideally it should fall directly away from the tosser in the "12 o'clock" position. The movement can be broken down to several segments. The tosser first balances the caber upright against his or her shoulder and neck (tapered end should be downwards). The tosser then crouches, sliding their interlocked hands down the caber and under the rounded base, and lifts it in their cupped hands. The tosser then walks or runs a few paces forward to gain momentum, and flips the tapered end upwards so that the large end hits the ground first, and if well tossed, the caber falls directly away from the tosser. The judging of Caber toss might be deceptive. The straightest end-over-end toss scores highest. If the caber lands on its end but falls back towards the thrower, the score is lower than for any end-over-end throw, but is based upon the maximum vertical angle that the caber achieved (side-judging may involve a second judge). End-over-end tosses are scored according to the hours on a clock, with a 12 o'clock score being highest (falling directly away from the thrower), down to a 9 or 3 for cabers that reach a vertical, before falling to the side.

==== Keg toss ====
This event which is predominately evolving from Irish Highland games, involves the heaving of a standard half-barrel beer keg over a horizontal bar using both hands. The keg is completely emptied for better stability and to avoid injuries. The basic technique involves swinging the keg in a pendulum like manner and releasing when it is at its apex. The event or its modified variations are quite often used in modern day Strongman competitions. In 2010 World's Strongest Man the 8 keg standardization was introduced where the competitors had to throw 8 beer kegs of increasing weights ranging from 17 to 24 kg over a 4-meter bar. Keg for maximum height is also a staple Highland games and Strongman event with 12.5 kg, 15 kg and 25 kg being the most common weights used.

==== Sheaf toss ====
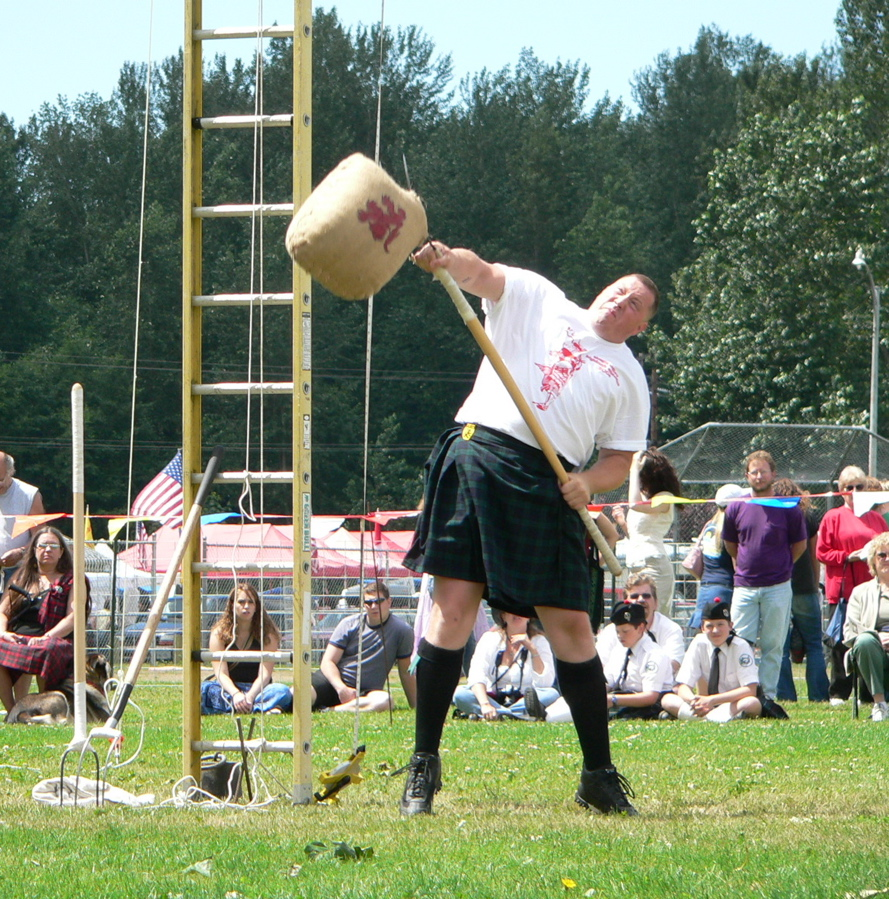
Sheaf toss

In this event, a bundle of straw (the sheaf) weighing 20 pounds (9.1 kg) for the men and 10 pounds (4.5 kg) for the women, and wrapped in a burlap bag is tossed vertically with a pitchfork over a raised bar much like that used in pole vaulting. The progression and scoring of this event is similar to the Weight over bar. However, there is significant debate among athletes as to whether the sheaf toss is in fact an authentic Highland event. Some argue it is actually a country fair event, but many agree that it is a great crowd pleaser. It is also a traditional sport in the Basque Country, and is often featured at agricultural shows such as the annual Sykehouse Show in South Yorkshire, England.

==== Maide-leisg ====
Maide-leisg (Gaelic for 'lazy stick', pronounced [matʲəˈʎeʃkʲ]) is a trial of strength performed by two competitors sitting on the ground with the soles of their feet pressing against each other. Thus seated, they hold a stick between their hands which they pull against each other until one of them is raised from the ground. The oldest maide-leisg competition in the world takes place at the Carloway show and Highland games on the Isle of Lewis. There's also a popular variation of the event performed in Yakuts communities often called Mas-wrestling.

Many of the heavy events competitors in Scottish highland athletics are former high school and college track and field athletes who find the Scottish games are a good way to continue their competitive careers. Increasingly in the US, the heavy events are attracting women, as well as master-class athletes, which has led to a proliferation of additional classes in heavy-events competitions. Lighter implements are used in the women's classes.

=== Music ===
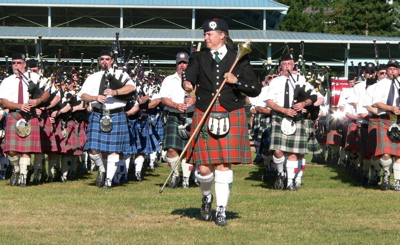
Massed bands at the 2005 Pacific Northwest Highland Games

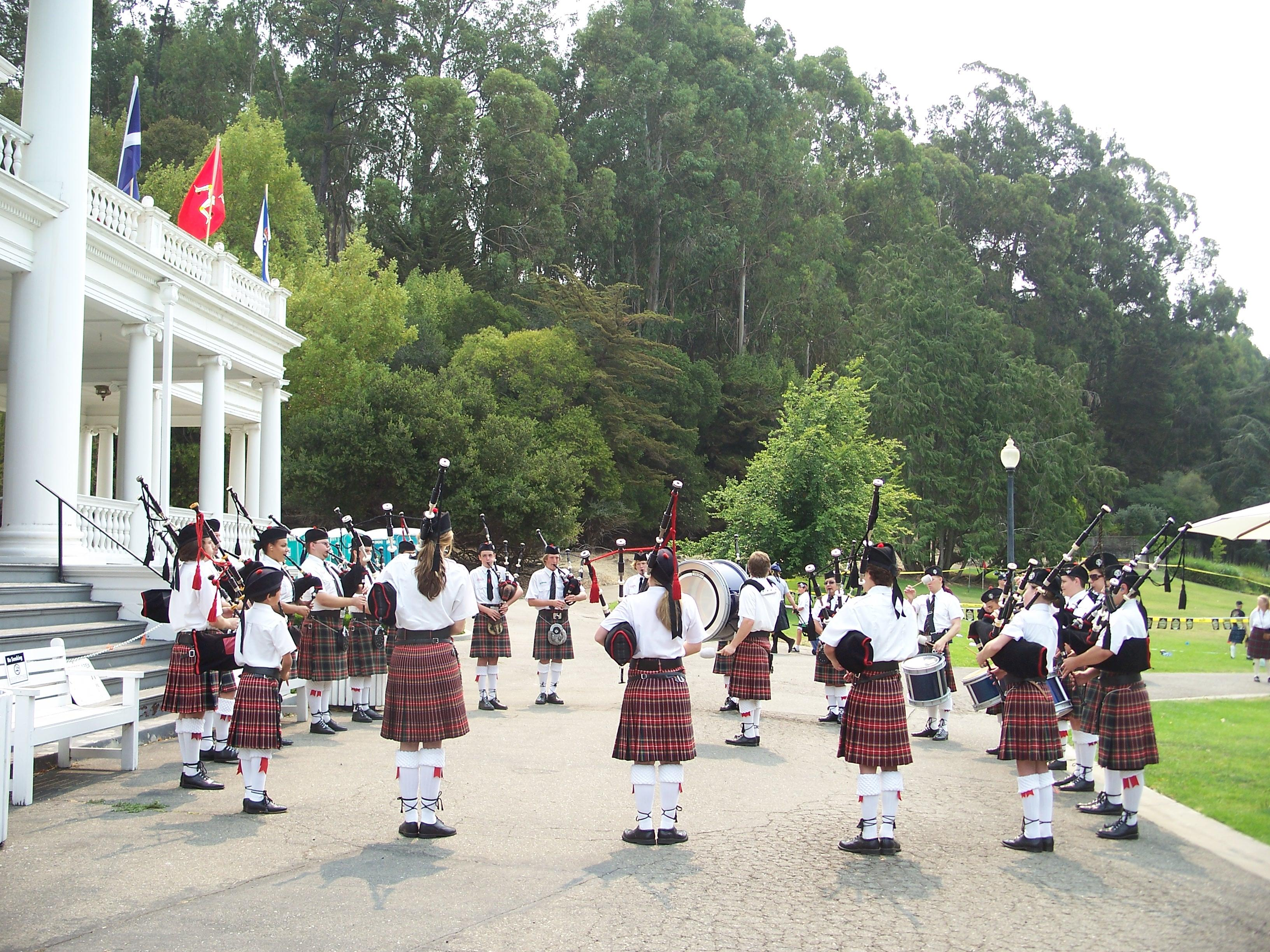
Highland Pipeband Competition Circle (Prince Charles Pipe Band 2008)

A significant part of the games is the massing of the pipe bands. Normally held in conjunction with the opening and closing ceremonies of the games, as many as 20 or more pipe bands will march and play together. Scotland the Brave and Amazing Grace are among the songs performed.

The music of the great Highland bagpipe has come to symbolize music at the games and of Scotland itself. In addition to the massed bands (when all the attending pipe bands play together), nearly all Highland games gatherings feature a wide range of piping and drumming competition, including solo piping and drumming, small group ensembles and full the pipe bands.

Music at Highland games gatherings also includes other forms, such as fiddling, harp circles, and Celtic bands.

=== Dance ===
The Cowal Highland Gathering hosts the annual World Highland Dancing Championship. This event gathers the best competitive dancers from around the world who compete for the RSOBHD sanctioned World Championship title. But most other Highland Games have dancing as well. The impressiveness of the performance varies wildly depending on the section dancing, with the 4/5/6 year old Primary dancers bringing the cuteness but not necessarily the technique compared to the 10-30+ year olds that are typical of the Premier (Open) section. The dances performed can vary quite a lot depending on the size of the dancing boards, access to swords for dancing over, and just preference of which dances to perform. Among the most common dances are the Highland Fling, the Sword Dance or the Ghillie Callum, the Seann Triubhas, the Irish Jig and the Hornpipe. Of these dances three (Highland Fling, Sword Dance, and Seann Triubhas) are performed wearing the semi-traditional kilt whilst the Irish Jig and the Hornpipe have specific outfits for their dances.

=== Secondary events and attractions ===
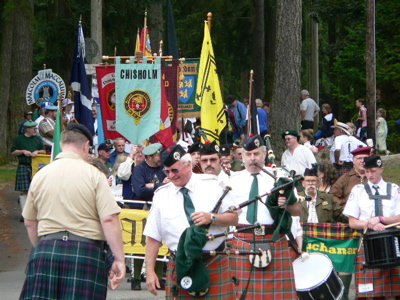
Assembling for the parade of clans at the 2005 Tacoma Highland Games

At modern-day Highland Games events, a wide variety of other activities and events are available. Foremost among these are the clan tents and vendors of Scottish related goods. The various clan societies make the Highland games one of the main focus of their seasonal activities, usually making an appearance at as many such events as possible. Visitors can find out information about the Scottish roots and can become active in their own clan society if they wish. These are more common at Highland Games held outside of Scotland as there is less of a demand for them in Scotland, which is not to say that they do not pop up from time to time.

At modern games, armouries will display their collections of swords and armour, and often perform mock battles. Various vendors selling Scottish memorabilia are also present selling everything from Irn-Bru to the stuffed likeness of the Loch Ness Monster.

Herding dog trials and exhibitions are often held, showcasing the breeder's and trainer's skills. In addition, there may be other types of Highland animals present, such as the Highland cattle.

Various traditional and modern Celtic arts are often showcased. These could include harpers' circles, Scottish country dancing, and one or more entertainment stages. In addition, most events usually feature a pre-event ceilidh (a type of social event with traditional music, dancing, song, and other forms of entertainment).

Various food vendors will also offer assorted types of traditional Scottish refreshment and sustenance.

== In popular culture ==
The Highland games phenomenon is satirised by Neil Munro in his Erchie MacPherson story, "Duffy's Day Off", first published in the Glasgow Evening News on 22 August 1904.

Season 4 of the historical docudrama The Crown prominently features Highland games in Episode 2 ("The Balmoral Test"). Rothiemurchus Estate near Aviemore was the main filming location for scenes set at the Braemar Gathering Highland games.

The Canadian mystery drama Murdoch Mysteries highlights Toronto's historic connection to Scottish culture in Season 17, Episode 11 ("A Heavy Event"), when the murder of a Scottish dancer at the Highland Games uncovers old clan rivalries. The episode features Highland dance numbers choreographed by Sherry Sim from the Sim School of Highland Dance in Embro, Ontario.

Outlander, adapted from books by Diana Gabaldon, depicts Highland games and other Scottish cultural events throughout the series, leading to the boost in tourism known as the "Outlander effect". Notable examples include Season 1, Episode 4 ("The Gathering"), which features a Clan Mackenzie gathering and the traditional Highland sport of shinty, and Season 4, Episode 3 ("The False Bride"), in which time-travelers Roger Wakefield and Brianna Randall attend a Scottish heritage festival in North Carolina in 1970. This event was heavily inspired by the real-world Grandfather Mountain Highland Games.

== Major events in Scotland ==
Location	Name of Event	Details
Alva, Clackmannanshire	Alva Highland Games	Johnstone Park, Alva at the foot of the Ochil Hills. First held in summer 1856.
Blair Atholl, Perthshire	Atholl Gathering	Europe's only private military unit, the Atholl Highlanders, open the games in the grounds of Blair Castle.
Braemar, Aberdeenshire	Braemar Gathering	Attended by the British royal family.
Brodick, Isle of Arran	Brodick Highland Games	First held in 1886.
Burntisland, Fife	Burntisland Highland Games	Second oldest in the world
Carloway, Isle of Lewis	Carloway Show and Highland Games	Home to the oldest 'Maide Leisg' competition in the world
Ceres, Fife	Ceres Highland Games	Oldest free games in Scotland
Crieff, Perthshire	Crieff Highland Games	Home of the Scottish Heavyweight Championships and has the Duke of Rothesay (Prince William) as the Royal Chieftain
Dunoon, Argyllshire	Cowal Highland Gathering	Biggest games in Scotland
Glenisla, Angus	Glenisla Highland Games	Started in 1869
Gourock, Inverclyde	Gourock Highland Games	The first Highland games of the Scottish season – held on the second Sunday in May
Halkirk, Caithness	Halkirk Highland Games	Started in 1886
Inverkeithing, Fife	Inverkeithing Highland Games	
Lochearnhead, Perthshire	Balquhidder, Lochearnhead and Strathyre Highland Games	Cameron, MacLaren and MacGregor clans linked to the games
Luss, Dunbartonshire	Luss Highland Gathering	Clan Colquhoun linked to the games. Held regularly since 1875.
Strathdon, Aberdeenshire	Lonach Highland Gathering & Games	Held by The Lonach Highland & Friendly Society Est. 1823, features the march of the Lonach Highlanders consisting of Forbes, Wallace and Gordons
Perth, Perthshire	Perth Highland Games	Held on the second Sunday in August
Pitlochry, Perthshire	Pitlochry Highland Games	
Portree, Skye	Isle of Skye Highland Games	
St. Andrews, Fife	St. Andrews Highland Games	
Stirling	Stirling Highland Games	First Stirling Highland Games were held in July 1870
Tobermory, Isle of Mull	Mull Highland Games	Held every third Thursday in July, supported by Clan MacLean; considered one of the most picturesque Games events, overlooking Tobermory Bay and the Sound of Mull
Inverness	Inverness Highland Games	Staged in the world's oldest highland games stadium, Northern Meeting Park
Nairn	Nairn Highland Games	Always one of the largest and most popular amateur gatherings in the North, the Nairn Highland Games have been an annual feature on Nairn’s summer calendar since being moved to 10 August in 1867. Prior to that, they were a winter Games, first held on 25 December 1865. The town is justifiably proud of this, the foremost event in the Burgh calendar.

== Major events outside Scotland ==
=== Australia ===
Location	Name
Daylesford, Victoria	Highland Gathering
Maclean, NSW	Maclean Highland Gathering

=== Belgium ===
Location	Name
Alden Biesen	Scottish weekend

=== Bermuda ===
Location	Name
Somerset (2012); Pembroke (2013)	Bermuda Highland Games

=== Brazil ===
Location	Name
Estância Velha, Rio Grande do Sul	Scout Highland Games - GEJL46RS
Sapucaia do Sul, Rio Grande do Sul	Brazilian Scottish Highland Games

=== Canada ===
On 1 August 1997, Canada Post issued "Highland Games" designed by Fraser Ross, based on photographs by Andrew Balfour. The 45¢ stamps are perforated 12.5 x 13 and were printed by Canadian Bank Note Company.

Location	Name	Month Held
Alberta
Calgary, Alberta	Calgary Highland Games	September
Canmore, Alberta	Canmore Highland Games	September
Edmonton, Alberta	Edmonton Scottish Society Highland Gathering	June
Grande Prairie, Alberta	Grande Prairie Highland Games	June
High River, Alberta	Foothills Highland Games	August
Red Deer, Alberta	Red Deer Highland Games	June
British Columbia
Coquitlam, British Columbia	BC Highland Games	June
Kamloops, British Columbia	Kamloops Highland Games	July
Penticton, British Columbia	Penticton Scottish Festival	July
Victoria, British Columbia	Victoria Highland Games	May
Manitoba
East Selkirk, Manitoba	Manitoba Highland Gathering	June
Winnipeg, Manitoba	Pavilion of Scotland, Folklorama	August
Winnipeg, Manitoba	Transcona Highland Gathering	September
New Brunswick
Fredericton, New Brunswick	New Brunswick Highland Games	July
Moncton, New Brunswick	Moncton Highland Games	June
Perth-Andover, New Brunswick	Gathering of the Scots Festival	May
Nova Scotia
Antigonish, Nova Scotia	Antigonish Highland Games	July
New Glasgow, Nova Scotia	Festival of the Tartans & Highland Games	July
Ontario
Almonte, Ontario	North Lanark Highland Games	August
Cambridge, Ontario	Cambridge Highland Games	July
Cobourg, Ontario	Cobourg Highland Games	June
Embro, Ontario	Embro Highland Games	July
Fergus, Ontario	Fergus Scottish Festival and Highland Games	August
Georgetown, Ontario	Georgetown Highland Games	June
Kincardine, Ontario	Kincardine Scottish Festival & Highland Games	July
Kingston, Ontario	Kingston Scottish Festival	May
Maxville, Ontario	Glengarry Highland Games	August
Sutton, Ontario	The Georgina Gathering	June
Uxbridge, Ontario	The Highlands of Durham Games	July
Quebec
Montreal, Quebec	Montreal Highland Games	August
Saskatchewan
Moose Jaw, Saskatchewan	Saskatchewan Highland Gathering & Festival (not to be held in 2015)	May
Regina, Saskatchewan	Saskatchewan Highland Gathering & Festival	May

=== Czech Republic ===
Location	Name
Brno	MonteBú Highland Games
Sychrov Castle	Skotské hry Sychrov

=== Hungary ===
Location	Name
Csesznek, Veszprém	Scottish Highland Games (Skót Felföldi Játékok)
Zichyújfalu, Fejér	Highland Games Cup (Felföldi Játékok Kupa)

=== Indonesia ===
Location	Name
Jakarta	Jakarta Highland Gathering

=== New Zealand ===
Location	Name
Hororata	Hororata Highland Games (2011)
Fairlie	Mackenzie Easter Show & Highland Games (1898)
Paeroa	Paeroa Highland Games & Tattoo (1993)
Turakina	Turakina Highland Games (1864)
Waipu	Waipu Highland Games (1871)

=== Switzerland ===
Location	Name
Abtwil, St. Gallen	Appowila Highland Games
Fehraltdorf, Zurich	Highland-Games Fehraltdorf
Ingenbohl, Schwyz	Highland Games Innerschweiz

=== United States ===
Location	Name
Palmer, Alaska	Alaska Scottish Highland Games
Phoenix, Arizona	Scottish Highland Games
Prescott, Arizona	Prescott Highland Games & Celtic Faire
Tucson, Arizona	Tucson Celtic Festival & Scottish Highland Games
Monterey, California	Monterey Scottish Games & Celtic Festival
Pleasanton, California	Scottish Highland Gathering and Games
San Diego, California	San Diego Scottish Highland Games & Gathering of the Clans
Santa Cruz County, California	Scottish Renaissance Festival featuring the Loch Lomond Highland Games & Celtic Gathering
Ventura, California	Seaside Highland Games
Woodland, California	Sacramento Valley Scottish Games & Festival
Elizabeth, Colorado	Elizabeth Celtic Festival
Estes Park, Colorado	Longs Peak Scottish-Irish Highland Festival
Brooklyn, Connecticut	Scotland Connecticut Highland Games
Dunedin, Florida	Dunedin Highland Games and Festivals
Green Cove Springs, Florida	Northeast Florida Scottish Highland Games
Marianna, Florida	The Big Bend Highland Games & Scottish Festival
Sarasota, Florida	Sarasota Highland Games
Blairsville, Georgia	Blairsville Scottish Festival & Highland Games
Stone Mountain, Georgia	Stone Mountain Highland Games and Scottish Festival
Honolulu, Hawaii	Hawaiian Scottish Festival and Highland Games
Columbus, Indiana	Columbus Scottish Festival and Highland Games
Indianapolis, Indiana	Indianapolis Scottish Highland Games and Festival
South Bend, Indiana	Celtic Festival and Bryan Verkler Invitational Highland Games
Davenport, Iowa	Celtic Festival and Highland Games of the Quad-Cities
Eminence, Kentucky	Highland Renaissance Festival
Glasgow, Kentucky	Glasgow Highland Games
Baton Rouge, Louisiana	The Highland Games of Louisiana
Belfast, Maine	Belfast Celtic Celebration
Andover, Maine	Mountain Misfits Athletics
Windsor, Maine	Maine Highland Games and Scottish Festival
Hallowell, Maine	Hallowell Backyard Games
Mount Airy, Maryland	Frederick Celtic Festival
St. Leonard, Maryland	Southern Maryland Celtic Festival and Highland Gathering
Florence, Massachusetts	Glasgow Lands Scottish Festival
Alma, Michigan	Alma Highland Festival and Games
Livonia, Michigan	St. Andrew's Society of Detroit Highland Games
Parchment, Michigan	Kalamazoo Scottish Festival
Sparta, Michigan	Sparta Celtic Festival
St. Charles, Missouri	Missouri Tartan Day Festivities
St. Louis, Missouri	St. Louis Scottish Games and Cultural Festival
Hamilton, Montana	Bitterroot Celtic Games & Gathering
Kalispell, Montana	Flathead Celtic Festival
Lincoln, New Hampshire	New Hampshire Highland Games & Festival
Las Vegas, Nevada	Las Vegas Celtic Society Highland Games
Altamont, New York	Capital District Scottish Games
Liverpool, New York	CNY Scottish Games & Celtic Festival
Olcott, New York	Niagara Celtic Heritage Festival & Highland Games
Old Westbury, New York	Scottish Festival and Games
Huntersville, North Carolina	Loch Norman Highland Games
Laurinburg, North Carolina	Scotland County Highland Games
Linville, North Carolina	Grandfather Mountain Highland Games
Winston-Salem, North Carolina	Bethabara Highland Games
Tulsa, Oklahoma	ScotFest
Portland, Oregon	Portland Highland Games
Bethlehem, Pennsylvania	Celtic Classic Highland Games & Festival
Ligonier, Pennsylvania	Ligonier Highland Games
Charleston, South Carolina	Charleston Scottish Games and Highland Gathering
Greenville, South Carolina	Gallabrae Greenville Scottish Games
Elizabethton, Tennessee	Scottish Heavy Athletics Clinic and Competition / East Tennessee Celtic Festival
Gatlinburg, Tennessee	Gatlinburg Scottish Highland Games
Townsend, Tennessee	Smoky Mountain Scottish Festival and Games at Townsend, Tennessee
Arlington, Texas	Texas Scottish Festival and Highland Games
Austin, Texas	Austin Celtic Festival
Grapevine, Texas	Grapevine Celtic Heritage Festival and Highland Games
Houston, Texas	Houston Celtic Festival and Highland Games
Sherman, Texas	Sherman Celtic Festival and Highland Games
Moab, Utah	Scots on the Rocks
Payson, Utah	Payson Scottish Festival
Salt Lake City, Utah	Utah Scots Festival
St. George, Utah	RedStone Games
Delaplane, Virginia	Virginia Scottish Games and Festival
Radford, Virginia	Radford Highlander's Festival
Enumclaw, Washington	Pacific NW Scottish Highland Games & Clan Gathering
Kelso, Washington	Kelso Highlander Festival
Bridgeport, West Virginia	North Central West Virginia Scottish Festival and Celtic Gathering
Milwaukee, Wisconsin	Milwaukee Highland Games
Waukesha, Wisconsin	Wisconsin Highland Games

== See also ==
- Basque rural sports
- History of physical training and fitness
- Sport in Scotland
- The Gathering 2009
- World Highland Games Championships
