= Glengarry Highland Games =

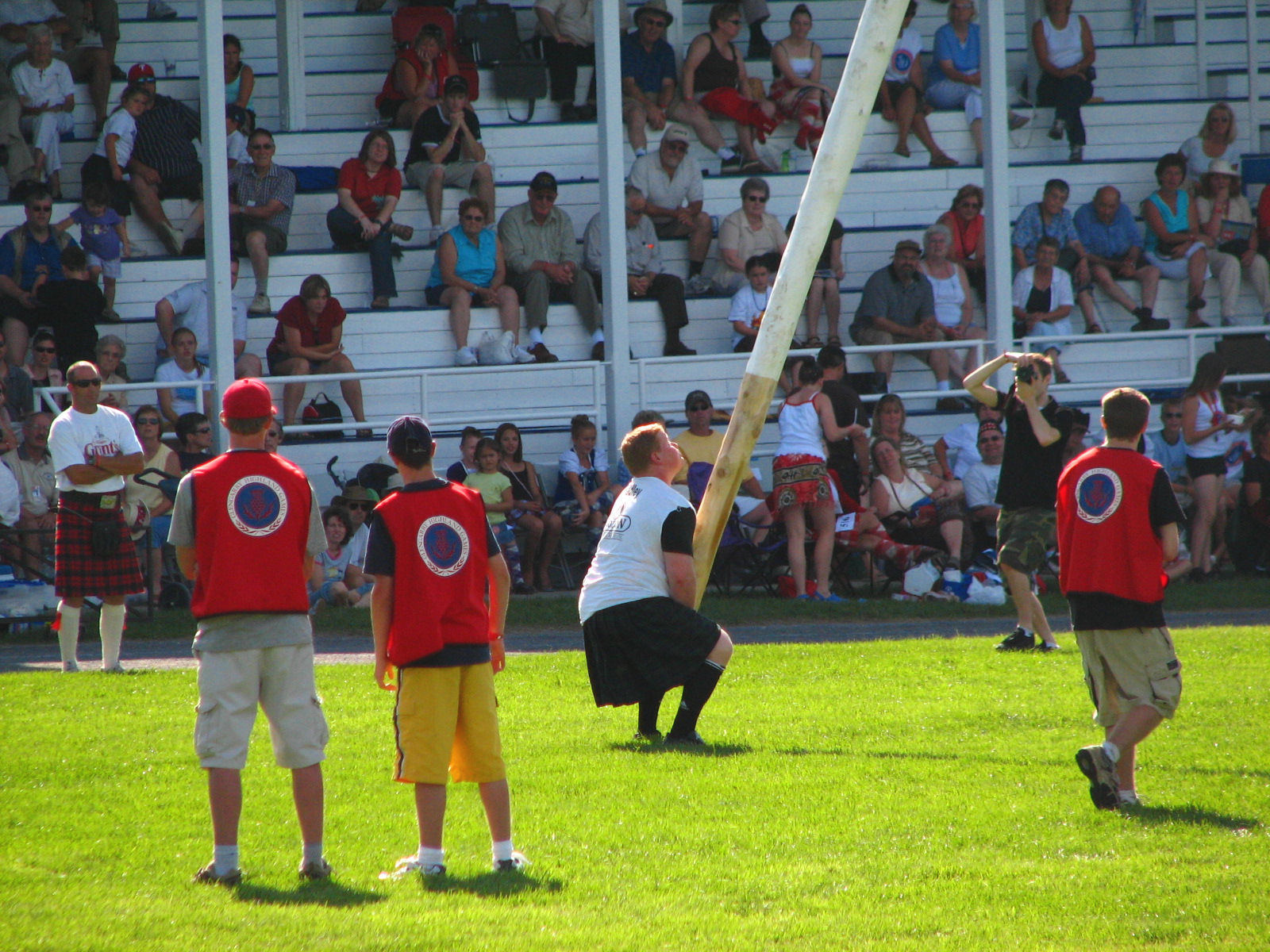
Tossing the caber

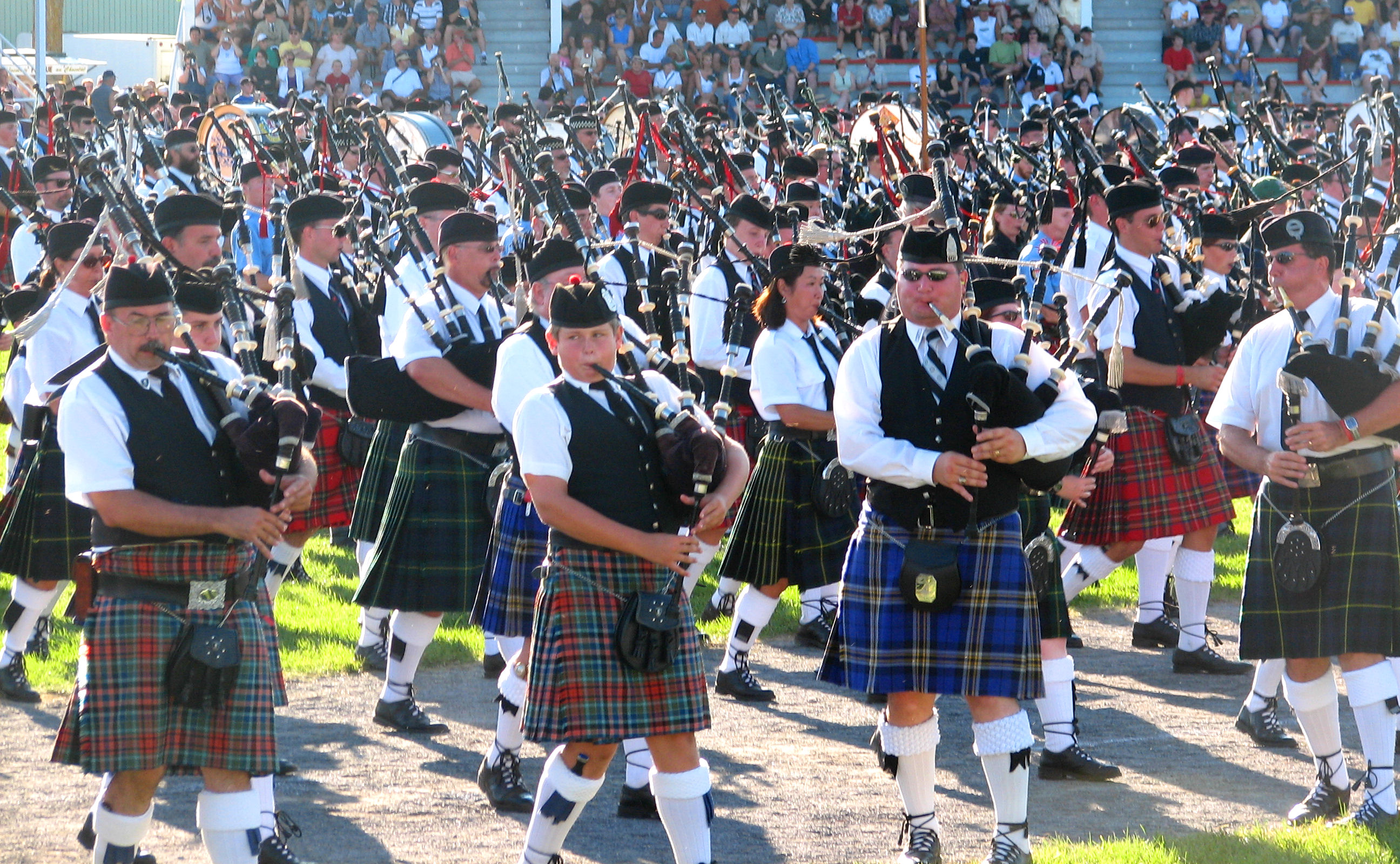
Massed pipe bands

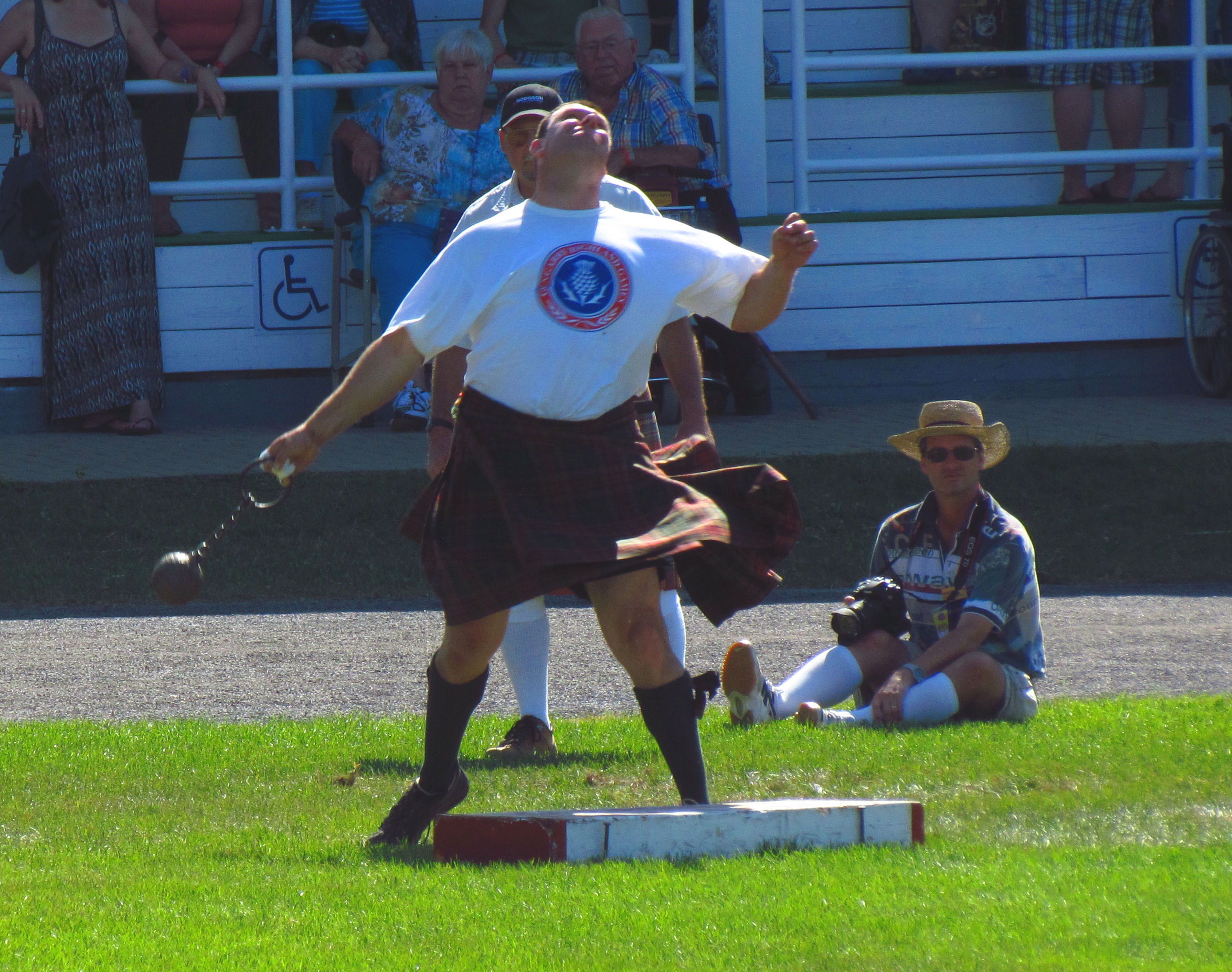
Heavyweight competitor in 56 lb weight for distance event

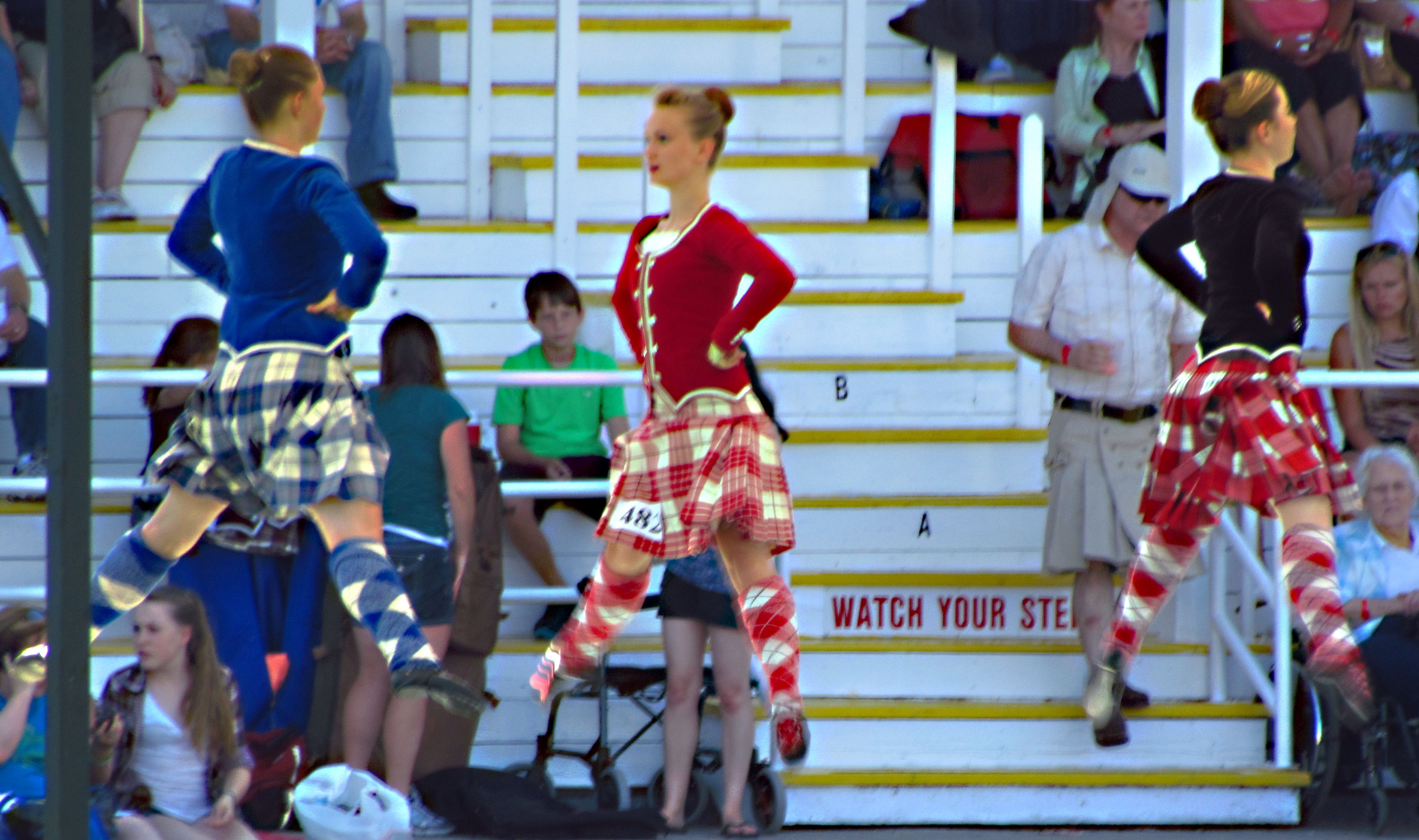
Scottish dancers

The Glengarry Highland Games consist of a series of traditional Scottish competitions held annually in Maxville, Ontario, Canada, usually held the first weekend in August. The games span two days and with an attendance of over 20,000, are the largest Highland Games outside of Scotland. The Glengarry Highland Games are primarily intended to be a showcase of traditional Scottish heavy events, Highland Dance, pipe and drum competitions.

== History ==
The Glengarry Games were first staged in 1948. Although primarily intended to be a showcase of traditional Scottish events such as the caber toss, the games also serve as an annual gathering of area residents as well as the various Scottish clan societies across Canada and the United States.

The games have evolved to be home of North America's most competitive and prestigious Scottish cultural events, particularly in bagpiping and drumming. The North American Pipe Band Championships are held in Maxville annually, and see pipe bands across North America competing in every grade.

The Canadian Piobaireachd Society Gold Medal and Bar to the Medal contests have also been held in Maxville since 1973.

On Saturday 31 July 2004, the MacCulloch School of Dance set a Guinness World Record for the 'Largest Massed Performance of Highland and Step Dance'. 505 dancers and two musicians performed for 5 minutes and 13 seconds in a display of Celtic dance.

== Events ==
=== Heavy events ===
The caber toss event involves tossing a 22-foot-long spruce log weighing about 125 lbs. The stone thrower event involves hurling a 25-lb. rock shot-put style. The 28-lb. and 56-lb. weight throw events involves using a one-handed throw to heave an iron block with iron ring attached. For the 16-lb. hammer throw, competitors propel a round metal ball with a wooden handle. The 56-lb. weight toss event involves competitors launching the weight over a pole vault.

=== Highland dancing ===
The Highland Dance are performed as ceremonial dances mainly by young female dance competitors. Historically, however, Highland dances, such as the Sword dance were performed by men over the body of a slain opponent as celebrations of victorious battles.

=== Piping and drumming ===
Maxville is home to the annual North American Pipe Band Championships. Solo competitions are also held during the games in both piping and drumming. During the Massed Bands, over 50 pipe and drum bands play together as a single entity.

== Recognition ==
In honour of the 50th anniversary of the Glengarry Highland Games held annually at Maxville, Ontario, Canada Post issued 'Highland Games' on 1 August 1997. The commemorative stamp was designed by Fraser Ross, based on photographs by Andrew Balfour. The 45¢ stamps are perforated 12.5 x 13 and were printed by Canadian Bank Note Company, Limited.

== See also ==
- Scottish Canadian
- Highland Games
