= Crieff Highland Games =

Annual sporting event in Crieff, Scotland

The Crieff Highland Gathering was founded in 1870 at Crieff in Scotland. It has been a regular fixture in August every year except during World War I and between 1939 and 1949. The Highland games on the weekend of 15th and 16 August 2020 were cancelled due to the worldwide coronavirus (COVID-19) pandemic. The games feature a large array of Highland Activities, including Highland dancing and heavyweight events. At first the games were held in Academy Park (within the grounds of Morrisons Academy School) but in 1880 moved to the Market Park where they have been ever since.

The highland games is run by Crieff Highland Gathering Ltd.

The event is twinned with the Ohio Scottish Games in the United States of America, following visits to each other's events and an agreement being signed in 2008.

== List of Chieftains since 2000 ==
The Chieftain of the games is the guest of honour and originates from the chieftains of the Highland clans.

2000 John Stark, Madderty (former golf professional, Crieff Golf Club)
2001 Ewan McGregor (Actor, former resident of Crieff)
2002 Elaine C Smith (Scottish actress)
2003 Bill Anderson MBE (former World Heavyweight event champion)
2004 Benny Higgins (former chief executive of Bank of Scotland and Tesco)
2005 Kenny Logan (Scottish international rugby player)
2006 Denis Lawson (actor)
2007 Donald Comrie (former head of 5th Perthshire Crieff Scouts)
2008 John Beattie (Scottish international rugby player and BBC Scotland radio host)
