= Sheaf toss =

Traditional Scottish agricultural sport

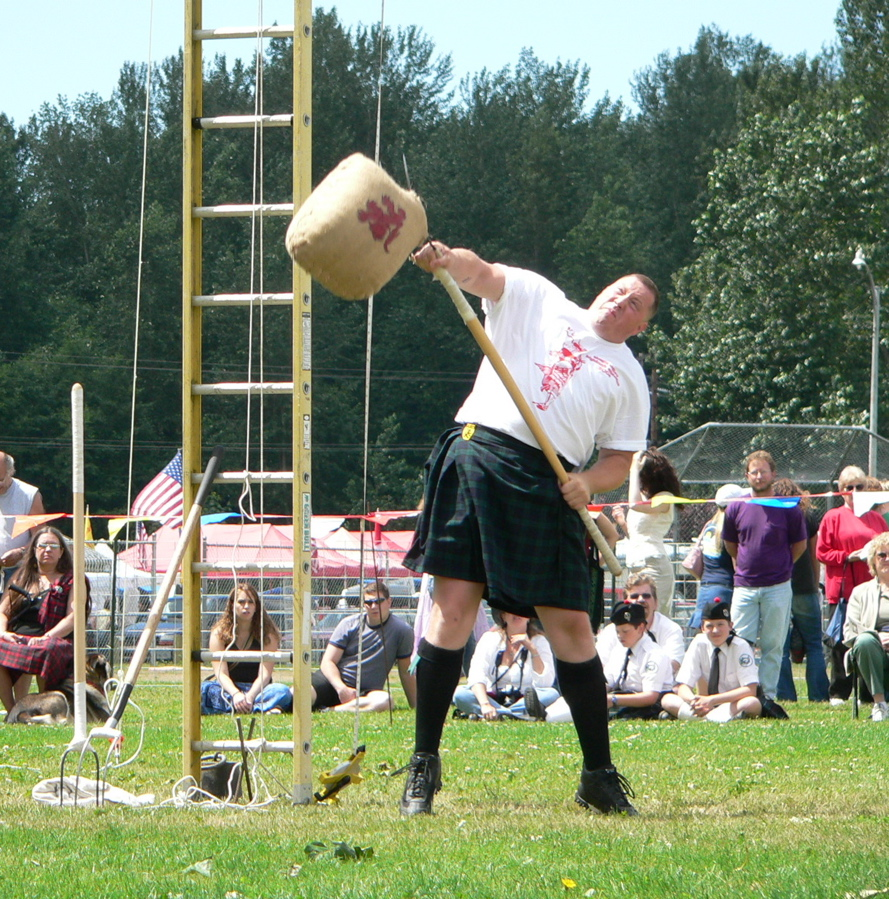
The sheaf toss event at the 2005 Skagit Valley Highland Games, in the state of Washington, United States.

The sheaf toss (Scottish Gaelic: sguab) is a traditional Irish and Scottish agricultural sport event originally contested at country fairs. A pitchfork is used to hurl a hessian bag stuffed with straw over a horizontal bar above the competitor's head. Typical weight for the bag is 16 or 20 lb (7.3 or 9.1 kg). Three chances are given to each competitor to cleanly go over the bar. After all challengers have made their attempts, the bar is raised and all successful competitors move on to the new height. This continues until all but one athlete is eliminated.

The Sheaf toss has been incorporated as an event at many of the Scottish highland games although technically it is not itself a heavy athletics event. The sheaf toss is also a traditional sport in the Basque Country. It is a feature of the annual Sykehouse Show in South Yorkshire, England.

Sheaf tossing is also contested in Ireland and Australia particularly at agricultural shows and at fairs; Irish sheaf tossing differs from sheaf tossing in Scotland and France in that the sheaf is made of rushes which are bound tightly with baling twine and are not placed in a bag. The rules are the same as the Scottish version and a pitchfork is used. The same pitchfork is usually used for all competitors so as not to give anybody an unfair advantage by allowing them use their own customised pitchfork. A variation of this rule is that if one brings a custom pitchfork to the competition, they must allow any other competitor to use that fork.

== World records ==
- 9.1 kg (20 lb) – 11.30 metres (37 ft 1 in) by Spencer Tyler (United States) (2019 Chicago Highland Games)
- 7.3 kg (16 lb) – 12.80 metres (42 ft 0 in) by Zach Riley (United States) (2017 Bartholomew Scottish Festival)

=== Progression of the world record ===
20 lb sheaf

Distance	Holder	Year	Location
9.50 metres (31 ft 2 in)	(Canada) Harry MacDonald	1997	Alexandria, Virginia, USA
9.61 metres (31 ft 6 in)	(United States) Robert Troupe	1997	Bethlehem, Pennsylvania, USA
9.69 metres (31 ft 9 in)	(United States) Karl Dodge	1998	Huntersville, North Carolina, USA
9.71 metres (31 ft 10 in)	(United States) Art McDermott	1998	Lincoln, New Hampshire, USA
10.06 metres (33 ft 0 in)	(United States) Karl Dodge	1998	Bethlehem, Pennsylvania, USA
10.21 metres (33 ft 6 in)	(United States) Karl Dodge	1999	McAlester, Oklahoma, USA
10.34 metres (33 ft 11 in)	(United States) Karl Dodge	1999	Highlands Ranch, Colorado, USA
10.36 metres (34 ft 0 in)	(United States) Ryan Vierra	2000	Stone Mountain, Georgia, USA
10.67 metres (35 ft 0 in)	(United States) Ryan Vierra	2001	Huntersville, North Carolina, USA
10.75 metres (35 ft 3 in)	(United States) Mike Smith	2004	Huntersville, North Carolina, USA
10.92 metres (35 ft 10 in)	(United States) Eric Frasure	2007	Stone Mountain, Georgia, USA
10.97 metres (36 ft 0 in)	(United States) Eric Frasure	2008	Stone Mountain, Georgia, USA
11.00 metres (36 ft 1 in)	(United States) Eric Frasure	2010	Huntersville, North Carolina, USA
11.03 metres (36 ft 2 in)	(United States) Eric Frasure	2010	Stone Mountain, Georgia, USA
11.12 metres (36 ft 6 in)	(United States) Spencer Tyler	2018	(To be confirmed)
11.15 metres (36 ft 7 in)	(United States) Spencer Tyler	2019	Long Beach, California, USA
11.30 metres (37 ft 1 in)	(United States) Spencer Tyler	2019	Chicago, Illinois, USA

== See also ==
- Basque hay bale tossing
- Sport in Scotland
