= Maxville, Ontario =

Unincorporated community in Ontario, Canada

Maxville
- Unincorporated community/ designated place
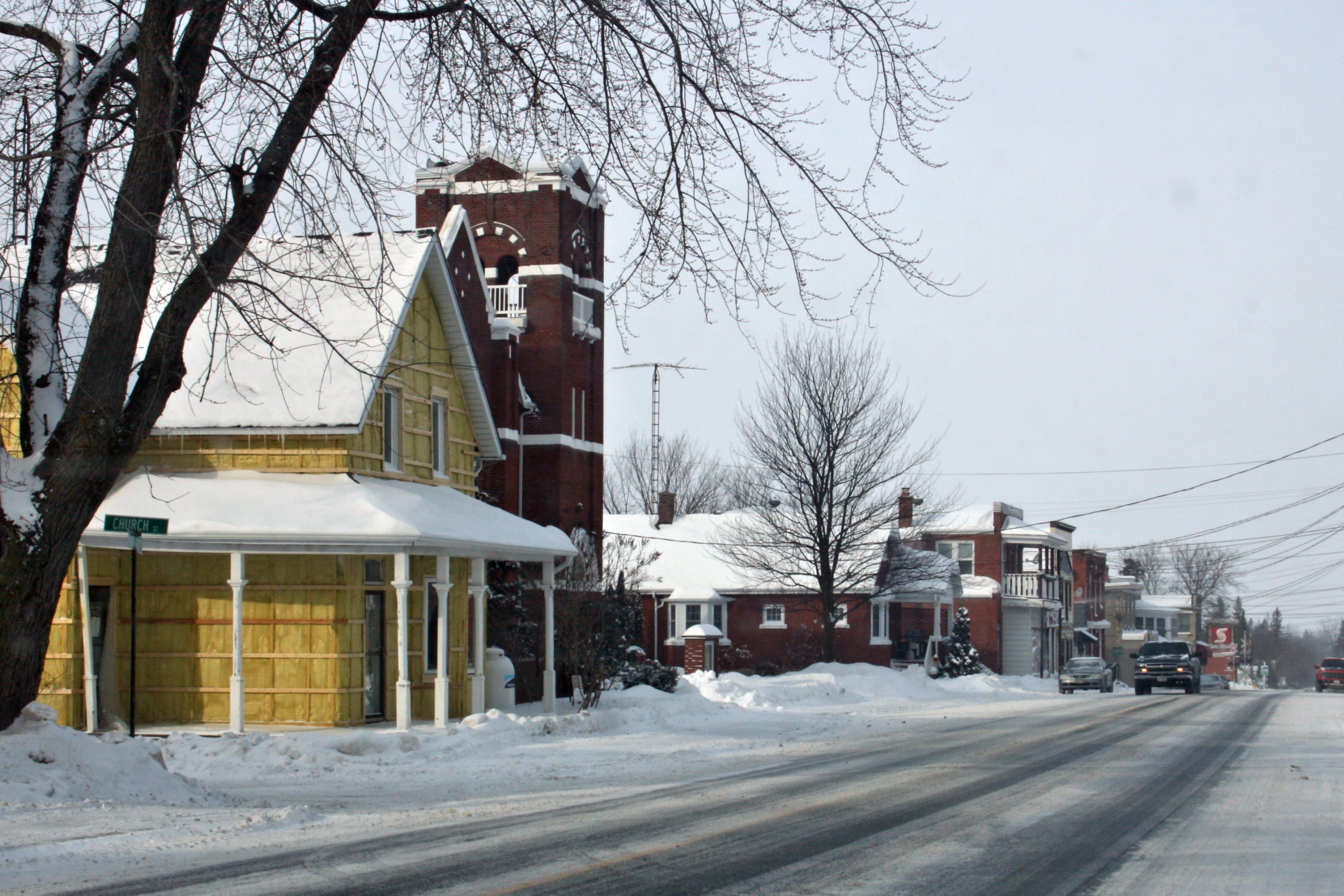

- Location within Southern Ontario
- Coordinates: 45°17′19″N 74°51′17″W
- Country: Canada
- Province: Ontario
- County: Stormont, Dundas and Glengarry
- Municipality: North Glengarry
- Settled: 1869
- Incorporated: 1891
- Dissolved (amalgamated): January 1, 1998

Government
  - Fed. riding: Stormont—Dundas—Glengarry
  - Prov. riding: Glengarry—Prescott—Russell

Area
  - Land: 2.03 km^{2} (0.78 sq mi)
- Elevation: 100 m (340 ft)

Population (2021)
  - Total: 748
  - Density: 367.9/km^{2} (953/sq mi)
- Time zone: UTC-5 (EST)
  - Summer (DST): UTC-4 (EDT)
- Postal code: K0C 1T0
- Area codes: 613

Maxville is an unincorporated community in North Glengarry, Ontario, Canada. It is recognized as a designated place by Statistics Canada.

Since 1948, Maxville is host to the annual Glengarry Highland Games.

Its economy mostly depends on services to surrounding agricultural businesses.

== History ==
Maxville was formed in 1869, formerly also called Mac’s Corners and Macsville. It was named after the many "Macs" of Scottish Highland origin living there. In 1881, the Canada Atlantic Railway was completed and a station was built in Maxville, resulting in quick growth. In 1891, Maxville was incorporated as a village municipality.

On July 5, 1910, the railway station burnt down, but a replacement one was built immediately. It closed in 1988 and demolished in the fall of 1998.

On January 1, 1998, the Village of Maxville, the Town of Alexandria, and the Townships of Kenyon and Lochiel were amalgamated into the new Township of North Glengarry.

== Demographics ==
In the 2021 Census of Population conducted by Statistics Canada, Maxville had a population of 748 living in 311 of its 321 total private dwellings, a change of −8.3% from its 2016 population of 816. With a land area of 2.03 km^{2} (0.78 sq mi), it had a population density of 368.5/km^{2} (954.3/sq mi) in 2021.

Historical census populations – Maxville (Population centre)

Year	Pop.	±%
1901	749	—
1911	759	+1.3%
1921	725	−4.5%
1931	769	+6.1%
1941	804	+4.6%
1951	778	−3.2%
1956	782	+0.5%

Year	Pop.	±%
1961	804	+2.8%
1966	771	−4.1%
1971	846	+9.7%
1976	852	+0.7%
1981	836	−1.9%
1986	815	−2.5%
1991	840	+3.1%

Year	Pop.	±%
1996	885	+5.4%
2001	864	−2.4%
2006	860	−0.5%
2011	811	−5.7%
2016	816	+0.6%
2021	748	−8.3%

Population counts prior to 1998 are for Maxville Village.
Source: Statistics Canada

== See also ==
- List of communities in Ontario
- List of designated places in Ontario
