= 1971 in music =

List of notable events in music that took place in the year 1971.

== Specific locations ==
- 1971 in British music
- 1971 in Japanese music
- 1971 in Norwegian music
- 1971 in Scandinavian music

== Specific genres ==
- 1971 in country music
- 1971 in heavy metal music
- 1971 in jazz
- 1971 in progressive rock

== Events ==
- February 1 – After months of feuding in the press, Ginger Baker and Elvin Jones hold a "drum battle" at The Lyceum.
- February 3 – Davy Jones announces he is leaving the Monkees.
- February 8 – Bob Dylan's hour-long documentary film, Eat the Document, is premièred at New York's Academy of Music. The film includes footage from Dylan's 1966 UK tour.
- February 16 – Alan Passaro of the Hells Angels, who was acquitted on January 19 of the killing of Meredith Hunter at the Altamont Speedway in 1969, files a lawsuit against the Rolling Stones for invasion of privacy because the documentary film Gimme Shelter showed the stabbing.
- February 19 – Queen performs their first public concert in London.
- March 1 – The line-up for Queen is completed when bassist John Deacon joins the band.
- March 4 – The Rolling Stones open their UK tour in Newcastle upon Tyne, intended as a "farewell" to the UK prior to the band's relocation to France as "tax exiles".
- March 5 – Ulster Hall, Belfast, Northern Ireland, sees the first live performance of Led Zeppelin's iconic song "Stairway to Heaven".
- March 6 – The Soul to Soul concert takes place in Accra, Ghana, headlined by Wilson Pickett.
- March 12–13 – The Allman Brothers Band records its live album, At Fillmore East.
- March 16 – The 13th Grammy Awards, honoring musical accomplishments of 1970, are presented. The ceremonies are broadcast on live television for the first time. Simon & Garfunkel win Album of the Year, Record of the Year and Song of the Year for their final album Bridge over Troubled Water and its title track. The Carpenters win Best New Artist.
- April 3 – The 16th Eurovision Song Contest, held in the Gaiety Theatre, Dublin, is won by Monaco with the song "Un banc, un arbre, une rue" sung by Séverine.
- April 6 – The Rolling Stones hold a party in Cannes to officially announce their new contract with Atlantic and the launch of Rolling Stones Records.
- April 8 – A bomb explodes at a CBC band gig in Saigon killing 2.
- April 19 – Gil Scott Heron records the first rap song, The Revolution Will Not Be Televised in RCA Studioe in New York.
- May 1 – Bill Withers releases seminal first album Just As I Am.
- May 12 – Mick Jagger marries Bianca de Macías in Saint-Tropez, France, in a Roman Catholic ceremony. Among the wedding guests are the remaining Rolling Stones, Paul McCartney, Ringo Starr, Eric Clapton and Stephen Stills.
- June – Rafael Kubelík becomes music director of the Metropolitan Opera, New York, at the invitation of Göran Gentele, the new general manager.

(May 21) Marvin Gaye releases his masterpiece album  'What's Going On' on May 21, 1971

- June 1 – Elvis Presley's birthplace, a two-room shack in Tupelo, Mississippi, is opened to the public as a tourist attraction.
- June 6 – John Lennon and Yoko Ono join Frank Zappa on stage at the Fillmore East for an encore jam. The performance would be released the following year on the Some Time in New York City album.
- June 8 – Carole King gives her first live concert, at Carnegie Hall.
- June 20-24 – The first Glastonbury Festival to take place at the summer solstice is held in South West England. Performers include David Bowie, Traffic, Fairport Convention, Quintessence and Hawkwind.
- June 21 – The Celebration of Life Festival finally gets underway- three and a half days late- at Pointe Coupee Parish, Louisiana. Pink Floyd, The Beach Boys, Miles Davis and B. B. King are among the performers.
- June 24 – The Celebration of Life Festival is closed down by authorities after promoters Stephen Kapelow and Ken Lind fail to provide enough supplies of food, medical and sanitary facilities. Only nine of twenty-seven advertised performers showed up, and about 150 festival-goers were arrested.
- June 27 – Promoter Bill Graham closes the Fillmore East in New York City with a final concert featuring The Allman Brothers Band, The Beach Boys and Mountain. Patrons are given commemorative posters at the door and find red roses on their seats.
- July 3 – Jim Morrison is found dead in a bath tub in Paris, France, aged 27. Alain Ronay would claim, years later, that he assisted Morrison's lover, Pamela Courson, in covering up the circumstances.
- July 4 – The Fillmore West is closed in San Francisco with a final show featuring Santana, Creedence Clearwater Revival and The Grateful Dead.
- July 9 – Grand Funk Railroad becomes only the second band (after the Beatles) to perform a sold-out concert at Shea Stadium breaking The Beatles record of selling out the venue.
- August 1
  - The Concert for Bangladesh at Madison Square Garden, New York, starring George Harrison, Ravi Shankar, Ringo Starr, Bob Dylan and Leon Russell; also featuring Billy Preston, Eric Clapton, Jesse Ed Davis and Badfinger.
  - The Sonny & Cher Comedy Hour premieres on CBS.
- August 14 – The Who release their fifth studio album Who's Next, reaching Number One in both the UK and the US.
- August 31 – John Lennon leaves Britain for New York City and will never return.
- September 11 – The Jackson 5ive, a Saturday morning cartoon series based on the popular Motown group The Jackson 5, premieres on ABC.
- September 11-12 – The Avandaro rock festival takes place in Valle de Bravo (Mexico) with an estimated attendance of 300,000.
- October 5 – Black Sabbath perform the first set of their Whisky a Go Go performance in all-white tuxedos.
- October 29 – The Allman Brothers Band's guitarist Duane Allman dies in a motorcycle accident in Macon, Georgia after colliding with a truck.
- October 31 – Pink Floyd release their sixth studio album Meddle. The album is considered a turning point, moving away from their psychedelic sound to a more progressive tone. It peaked at No. 3 on the UK Albums Chart.
- November 6 – Cher earns her first solo number one hit in US (Gypsys, Tramps & Thieves) staying atop for two consecutive weeks. Eventually the song was certified gold.
- November 8 – Led Zeppelin release officially untitled fourth studio album, which would become the biggest-selling album of the year (1972), the band's biggest-selling album, and the fourth best-selling album of all time.
- December 1 – Belgian singing duo Nicole & Hugo are married at Wemmel.
- December 4 – The Montreux Casino in Montreux, Switzerland, catches fire and burns during a performance by Frank Zappa and the Mothers of Invention when a fan fires a flare gun into its rafters. Members of Deep Purple, who were due to begin recording at the casino the next day, watched the scene from their hotel across Lake Geneva, and later immortalized the events in their song, "Smoke on the Water".
- December 10 – Frank Zappa breaks his leg after being pushed off the stage by a deranged fan at The Rainbow in London.
- December 31 – Bob Dylan makes a surprise appearance for the encore of The Band's New Year's Eve concert at the Academy of Music, joining the group for four songs including "Like a Rolling Stone".
- Lancelot Layne's "Blown Away" is the beginning of rapso music.
- Ann Wilson joins Heart, which moves to Vancouver, British Columbia.
- Kenny Rogers and The First Edition issued their Greatest Hits album, which will sell over 4 million copies worldwide by the end of the decade. They also star in their own TV series Rollin' on the River which runs until 1974.
- Brad Whitford replaces Ray Tabano on rhythm guitar in Aerosmith
- Elton John has first international hit with "Your Song".
- Donna Summer begins her recording career under her real name of Donna Gaines.
- Rick Springfield leaves Zoot for a highly successful solo career.
- Rick Wakeman joins Yes.
- Conrad Schnitzler leaves Kluster, which dissolves.
- The Beach Boys musician Daryl Dragon and singer Toni Tennille meet and begin to perform together as Captain & Tennille.
- The American Musical Instrument Society is founded.

== Bands formed ==
- See Musical groups established in 1971

== Bands reformed ==
- The Crystals

== Bands disbanded ==
- Booker T. & the M.G.'s
- Derek and the Dominos
- The Haunted
- The Monkees

== Albums released ==
=== January ===
Day	Album	Artist	Notes
4	Coal Miner's Daughter	Loretta Lynn	-
7	Elvis Country (I'm 10,000 Years Old)	Elvis Presley	
11	Chicago III	Chicago	–
11	Pearl	Janis Joplin	–
13	Deliverin'	Poco	Live
15	Hooker 'n Heat	John Lee Hooker and Canned Heat	–
–	Dust	Dust	Debut
–	Good Taste Is Timeless	The Holy Modal Rounders	-
–	Greatest Hits	Kenny Rogers and The First Edition	Compilation
–	Jerry Butler Sings Assorted Sounds	Jerry Butler	–
–	Little Feat	Little Feat	Debut
–	Live in Cook County Jail	B. B. King	Live
–	Lucifer's Friend	Lucifer's Friend	Debut
–	Melting Pot	Booker T & the MG's	–
–	Nantucket Sleighride	Mountain	–
–	Sister Kate	Kate Taylor	Debut
–	Straight Life	Freddie Hubbard	–
–	There Must Be More to Love Than This	Jerry Lee Lewis	–
–	You're Not Alone	Dion	–
–	ZZ Top's First Album	ZZ Top	Debut

=== February ===
Day	Album	Artist	Notes
1	Love's Lines, Angles and Rhymes	The 5th Dimension	–
1	if 2	If	–
2	The Point!	Harry Nilsson	–
2	The Song of Singing	Chick Corea	–
3	Love Story	Andy Williams	–
5	Once Again	Barclay James Harvest	–
8	Two of a Kind	Porter Wagoner and Dolly Parton	–
9	Carly Simon	Carly Simon	Debut
10	Church of Anthrax	John Cale and Terry Riley	–
10	Tapestry	Carole King	–
10	Love Story	Johnny Mathis	–
12	Salisbury	Uriah Heep	
15	The Golden Streets of Glory	Dolly Parton	-
19	The Yes Album	Yes	–
22	If I Could Only Remember My Name	David Crosby	Solo Debut
24	One Way... or Another	Cactus	–
24	Jack Johnson	Miles Davis	–
26	Straight, Clean and Simple	Anne Murray	–
–	Album II	Loudon Wainwright III	–
–	The Baby Huey Story: The Living Legend	Baby Huey	Debut
–	Crazy Horse	Crazy Horse	–
–	Fourth	Soft Machine	–
–	The Hawk	Ronnie Hawkins	–
–	Jack-Knife Gypsy	Paul Siebel	–
–	James Taylor and the Original Flying Machine	James Taylor	–
–	Journey in Satchidananda	Alice Coltrane	-
–	Live at the Sex Machine	Kool & the Gang	Live
–	Long Player	Faces	–
–	Mary	Mary Travers	Solo Debut
–	The Polite Force	Egg	–
–	Ring of Hands	Argent	–
–	Rita Coolidge	Rita Coolidge	Debut
–	Stoney End	Barbra Streisand	–
–	The Taker/Tulsa	Waylon Jennings	–
–	Up to Date	The Partridge Family	-

=== March ===
Day	Album	Artist	Notes
1	Search and Nearness	The Rascals	–
5	The Cry of Love	Jimi Hendrix	Compilation
5	Friends	Elton John	Soundtrack
5	Bryter Layter	Nick Drake	
5	Stone Age	The Rolling Stones	Compilation
9	Love It to Death	Alice Cooper	Straight Records; re-issued on Warner Bros. June '71
15	La Biblia	Vox Dei	–
16	Mud Slide Slim and the Blue Horizon	James Taylor	–
19	Aqualung	Jethro Tull	–
19	Songs of Love and Hate	Leonard Cohen	–
19	Wildlife	Mott the Hoople	–
22	You'll Never Walk Alone	Elvis Presley	Compilation
24	Histoire de Melody Nelson	Serge Gainsbourg	–
26	Percy	The Kinks	Soundtrack
–	Al Green Gets Next to You	Al Green	–
–	Indian Summer	Indian Summer	British Prog Band
–	Alpha Centauri	Tangerine Dream	-
–	Back to the Roots	John Mayall	–
–	Black Oak Arkansas	Black Oak Arkansas	Debut
–	Dave Mason & Cass Elliot	Dave Mason & Cass Elliot	–
–	Earth, Wind & Fire	Earth, Wind & Fire	Debut
–	Electronically Tested	Mungo Jerry	–
–	Manna	Bread	-
–	A Message to the People	Buddy Miles	–
–	Moments	Boz Scaggs	–
–	Motel Shot	Delaney & Bonnie	–
–	Mwandishi	Herbie Hancock	-
–	Please to See the King	Steeleye Span	–
–	Present Company	Janis Ian	–
–	Rat On!	Swamp Dogg	–
–	Rock On	Humble Pie	–
–	She Used to Wanna Be a Ballerina	Buffy St. Marie	–
–	Split	The Groundhogs	-
–	Tanz der Lemminge	Amon Düül II	–
–	Teenage Head	Flamin' Groovies	–
–	This Is Madness	The Last Poets	-
–	With Friends and Neighbors	Alex Taylor	Debut
–	Woodstock Two	Various Artists	-

=== April ===
Day	Album	Artist	Notes
2	Donny Hathaway	Donny Hathaway	–
5	Satori	Flower Travellin' Band	–
6	Poems, Prayers & Promises	John Denver	–
7	4 Way Street	Crosby, Stills, Nash & Young	Live
8	Givin' It Back	The Isley Brothers	–
8	In the Land of Grey and Pink	Caravan	–
8	Overdog	Keef Hartley	–
12	Joshua	Dolly Parton	-
12	Maybe Tomorrow	The Jackson 5	–
12	Where I'm Coming From	Stevie Wonder	–
15	Survival	Grand Funk Railroad	–
15	Third Album	Shocking Blue	–
16	Sun Ship	John Coltrane	Recorded 1965
19	L.A. Woman	The Doors	–
22	Hag	Merle Haggard	–
22	Sky's the Limit	The Temptations	–
23	Sticky Fingers	The Rolling Stones	–
30	The Doobie Brothers	The Doobie Brothers	Debut
30	Thin Lizzy	Thin Lizzy	Debut
30	Smiling Men with Bad Reputations	Mike Heron	Solo Debut
–	17-11-70	Elton John	Live
–	Toad	Toad	Debut
–	All by Myself	Eddie Kendricks	Solo Debut
–	Anne Briggs	Anne Briggs	Debut
–	The Best of The Guess Who	The Guess Who	-
–	Bloodrock 3	Bloodrock	–
–	Bring Me Home	Mother Earth	–
–	Broken Barricades	Procol Harum	–
–	Chase	Chase	Debut
–	Cheapo Cheapo Productions Presents Real Live John Sebastian	John Sebastian	Live
–	City of Gold	Pearls Before Swine	–
–	Elegy	The Nice	Live
–	Extraction	Gary Wright	–
–	Good Taste Is Timeless	The Holy Modal Rounders	–
–	Here Comes the Sun	Nina Simone	-
–	How Much More Can She Stand	Conway Twitty	–
–	Mirror Man	Captain Beefheart & his Magic Band	Recorded 1967
–	Oh! Pleasant Hope	Blue Cheer	–
–	Sho Is Funky Down Here	James Brown	-
–	Survival of the Fittest Live	Amboy Dukes	Live
–	Thirds	James Gang	–
–	Volcanic Action of My Soul	Ray Charles	-
–	War	War	–
–	When You're Hot, You're Hot	Jerry Reed	–

=== May ===
Day	Album	Artist	Notes
1	Just as I Am	Bill Withers	–
3	Leon Russell and the Shelter People	Leon Russell	–
5	Peaceful World	The Rascals	–
6	Songs from Wasties Orchard	Magna Carta	–
10	I Don't Know How to Love Him	Helen Reddy	–
12	Weather Report	Weather Report	–
14	Carpenters	Carpenters	–
14	Relics	Pink Floyd	Compilation
17	Ram	Paul and Linda McCartney	US; released in UK May 28
19	Aretha Live at Fillmore West	Aretha Franklin	Live
21	Rory Gallagher	Rory Gallagher	Solo Debut
21	What's Going On	Marvin Gaye	–
28	Every Picture Tells a Story	Rod Stewart	–
28	Songs for Beginners	Graham Nash	–
–	5th	Lee Michaels	–
–	And So: On	Jimmy Webb	–
–	Another Dimension	Bo Diddley	–
–	Beyond the Blue Horizon	George Benson	-
–	Contact	Freda Payne	–
–	Curtis/Live!	Curtis Mayfield	Live
–	Edgar Broughton Band	Edgar Broughton Band	–
–	A Groovy Situation	Reuben Wilson	-
–	Hamilton, Joe Frank & Reynolds	Hamilton, Joe Frank & Reynolds	–
–	The House on the Hill	Audience	-
–	If You Saw Thro' My Eyes	Ian Matthews	–
–	Joy to the World	Hoyt Axton	–
–	Live Johnny Winter And	Johnny Winter	Live
–	Man in Black	Johnny Cash	–
–	Nevada Fighter	Michael Nesmith	-
–	Never Never Land	Pink Fairies	Debut
–	Smash Your Head Against the Wall	John Entwistle	Debut
–	Something Else	Shirley Bassey	–
–	Stormcock	Roy Harper	–
–	Summer Side of Life	Gordon Lightfoot	–
–	Thembi	Pharoah Sanders	-
–	We Sure Can Love Each Other	Tammy Wynette	–
–	Winwood	Steve Winwood	Compilation
–	Zawinul	Joe Zawinul	-

=== June ===
Day	Album	Artist	Notes
3	Moving Gelatine Plates	Moving Gelatine Plates	Debut
4	Tarkus	Emerson, Lake & Palmer	–
5	The Donny Osmond Album	Donny Osmond	Debut
15	The Staple Swingers	The Staple Singers	-
15	Zero Time	Tonto's Expanding Head Band	-
16	Golden Bisquits	Three Dog Night	Compilation
16	Love Letters from Elvis	Elvis Presley	–
21	Ruby	Buck Owens	–
22	Blue	Joni Mitchell	–
23	Byrdmaniax	The Byrds	–
24	Runt. The Ballad of Todd Rundgren	Todd Rundgren	–
25	Indelibly Stamped	Supertramp	–
26	Colosseum Live	Colosseum	
30	Stephen Stills 2	Stephen Stills	–
–	34 Hours	Skid Row	-
–	Free Live!	Free	
–	Osibisa	Osibisa	
–	Aerial Pandemonium Ballet	Harry Nilsson	–
–	Angel Delight	Fairport Convention	–
–	Ash Ra Tempel	Ash Ra Tempel	-
–	Bird on a Wire	Tim Hardin	-
–	Blood, Sweat & Tears 4	Blood, Sweat & Tears	–
–	First Pull Up, Then Pull Down	Hot Tuna	–
–	The Flying Burrito Brothers	The Flying Burrito Brothers	–
–	Grin	Grin	–
–	Historic Dead	Grateful Dead	Live 1966
–	Homemade	The Osmonds	–
–	It Ain't Easy	Long John Baldry	–
–	Link Wray	Link Wray	–
–	Mick Abrahams	Mick Abrahams	–
–	New York City (You're a Woman)	Al Kooper	–
–	One World	Rare Earth	–
–	Randy Newman Live	Randy Newman	Live
–	San Francisco Dues	Chuck Berry	–
–	Sing Children Sing	Lesley Duncan	–
–	Sweet Replies	Honey Cone	-
–	Sweet Sweetback's Baadasssss Song	Melvin Van Peebles	Soundtrack
–	Touch	The Supremes	–
–	Touching Home	Jerry Lee Lewis	–
–	Toussaint	Allen Toussaint	–
–	What You Hear Is What You Get	Ike & Tina Turner	Live

=== July ===
Day	Album	Artist	Notes
1	C'mon Everybody	Elvis Presley	Compilation
1	Push Push	Herbie Mann	Album
2	Daddy Who? Daddy Cool	Daddy Cool	
6	At Fillmore East	The Allman Brothers Band	Live
6	Booker T. & Priscilla	Booker T & Priscilla Coolidge	–
6	High Time	MC5	–
6	Surrender	Diana Ross	–
12	Maggot Brain	Funkadelic	–
13	The Return of the Magnificent Seven	The Supremes and Four Tops	–
16	Acquiring the Taste	Gentle Giant	–
17	Ain't No Big Thing, But It's Growing	New Birth	-
21	Mirror	Emitt Rhodes	-
23	Every Good Boy Deserves Favour	The Moody Blues	–
26	The London Howlin' Wolf Sessions	Howlin' Wolf	–
–	Irish Coffee	Irish Coffee	Debut
–	Odyssey of Iska	Wayne Shorter	
–	Armchair Boogie	Michael Hurley & Pals	–
–	Blessed Are...	Joan Baez	–
–	Budgie	Budgie	Debut
–	Charity Ball	Fanny	–
–	Eloy	Eloy	Debut
–	Fireball	Deep Purple	US
–	Fool's Mate	Peter Hammill	–
–	(For God's Sake) Give More Power to the People	The Chi-Lites	–
–	From the Witchwood	Strawbs	–
–	Happy Birthday, Ruthy Baby	McGuinness Flint	–
–	Harmony Row	Jack Bruce	–
–	HMS Donovan	Donovan	
–	How Come the Sun	Tom Paxton	–
–	In the Garden	Gypsy	–
–	The Last Time I Saw Her	Glen Campbell	–
–	Lovejoy	Albert King	–
–	Ride the Wind	The Youngbloods	–
–	Sha Na Na	Sha Na Na	–
–	Shaft	Isaac Hayes	Soundtrack
–	The Silver Tongued Devil and I	Kris Kristofferson	-
–	So Long, Bannatyne	The Guess Who	–
–	Stop Your Motor	The Association	–
–	The Undisputed Truth	The Undisputed Truth	Debut

=== August ===
Day	Album	Artist	Notes
1	The Best of the Wailers	Bob Marley and the Wailers	–
2	Fillmore East – June 1971	The Mothers of Invention	Live
2	Who's Next	The Who	US
6	Master of Reality	Black Sabbath	
6	Stackridge	Stackridge	Debut
9	Someday We'll Look Back	Merle Haggard and The Strangers	–
11	You've Got a Friend	Johnny Mathis	–
25	Demon & Eleven Children	Creation (Japanese band) (Also Known as Blues Creation)	
25	Carmen Maki/Blues Creation	Carmen Maki & Blues Creation	
27	One Dozen Roses	Smokey Robinson & The Miracles	–
30	Live!	Fela Ransome-Kuti and The Africa '70 with Ginger Baker	–
30	Surf's Up	The Beach Boys	–
31	The Sun, Moon & Herbs	Dr. John	–
–	Barbra Joan Streisand	Barbra Streisand	–
–	Cedartown, Georgia	Waylon Jennings	–
–	Christian of the World	Tommy James	-
–	Experience	Jimi Hendrix	-
–	Freedom Flight	Shuggie Otis	–
–	Himself	Gilbert O'Sullivan	Debut
–	Hot Pants	James Brown	–
–	How Hard It Is	Big Brother and the Holding Company	-
–	I Wonder What She'll Think About Me Leaving	Conway Twitty	–
–	In Hearing of Atomic Rooster	Atomic Rooster	–
–	If 3	If	–
–	Live at Fillmore West	King Curtis	Live
–	My Baby Packed Up My Mind and Left Me	Dallas Frazier	–
–	New Riders of the Purple Sage	New Riders of the Purple Sage	Debut
–	Nigel Olsson's Drum Orchestra and Chorus	Nigel Olsson	–
–	Ronnie Milsap	Ronnie Milsap	–
–	Seven Tears	Golden Earring	–
–	Sing Me a Song of Songmy	Freddie Hubbard and İlhan Mimaroğlu	
–	Sometimes I Just Feel Like Smilin'	Butterfield Blues Band	–
–	Sound Magazine	The Partridge Family	-
–	A Space in Time	Ten Years After	–
–	Tago Mago	Can	–
–	Van Ronk	Dave Van Ronk	–
–	White Light	Gene Clark	aka Gene Clark
–	Yesterday's Wine	Willie Nelson	-
–	You've Got a Friend	Andy Williams	–

=== September ===
Day	Album	Artist	Notes
3	Future Games	Fleetwood Mac	–
5	From the Inside	Poco	–
8	Labelle	Labelle	–
9	Aretha's Greatest Hits	Aretha Franklin	Compilation
9	Imagine	John Lennon	US; released in UK Oct 8
10	Second Album	Curved Air	–
10	Welcome to the Canteen	Traffic	Live
15	Cahoots	The Band	–
15	Communication	Bobby Womack	–
15	Judee Sill	Judee Sill	–
17	Pilgrimage	Wishbone Ash	–
20	Fly	Yoko Ono	–
21	Faust	Faust	Debut
24	Electric Warrior	T.Rex	–
24	Santana	Santana	aka Santana III
24	Grateful Dead	Grateful Dead	Live
26	Tucky Buzzard	Tucky Buzzard	–
29	Goin' Back to Indiana	The Jackson 5	–
30	Harmony	Three Dog Night	–
30	Ko-ko Joe	Jerry Reed	–
–	20 Granite Creek	Moby Grape	–
–	Passport/Doldinger	Passport	Debut album
–	Aereo-Plain	John Hartford	–
–	April Wine	April Wine	–
–	Bark	Jefferson Airplane	–
–	Buddy Miles Live	Buddy Miles	Live
–	Closer to the Ground	Joy of Cooking	–
–	The Four of Us	John Sebastian	–
–	Genesis	Elvin Jones	-
–	Greatest Hits, Vol. 2	Johnny Cash	Compilation
–	Gypsys, Tramps & Thieves	Cher	Originally self-titled
–	Halfnelson	Halfnelson	Debut under original name
–	James Gang Live in Concert	James Gang	Live
–	Live Yardbirds: Featuring Jimmy Page	The Yardbirds	Live
–	The North Star Grassman and the Ravens	Sandy Denny	–
–	Rock Love	Steve Miller Band	–
–	Street Corner Talking	Savoy Brown	–
–	Talk It Over in the Morning	Anne Murray	–
–	The Time to Live is Now	Buzzy Linhart	–
–	Trafalgar	Bee Gees	–
–	Transition	Kenny Rogers and The First Edition	–
–	Visions	Grant Green	–

=== October ===
Day	Album	Artist	Notes
1	Teaser and the Firecat	Cat Stevens	–
1	Would You Take Another Chance on Me?	Jerry Lee Lewis	–
4	200 Motels	Frank Zappa	Soundtrack
4	Coat of Many Colors	Dolly Parton	–
4	Rudy the Fifth	Ricky Nelson and the Stone Canyon Band	–
4	Twins	Ornette Coleman	–
5	1001° Centigrades	Magma	Also known as Magma 2
8	Distant Light	The Hollies	UK
8	In Search of Space	Hawkwind	–
8	Message from the Country	The Move	–
11	B.B. King in London	B. B. King	US
12	First Light	Freddie Hubbard	-
15	Look at Yourself	Uriah Heep	-
15	Tupelo Honey	Van Morrison	–
18	Other Voices	The Doors	–
18	Restrictions	Cactus	–
20	Elvis sings The Wonderful World of Christmas	Elvis Presley	Christmas
24	American Pie	Don McLean	–
25	Chicago at Carnegie Hall	Chicago	Live
25	Naturally	JJ Cale	Debut
25	Rough and Ready	The Jeff Beck Group	–
29	Fearless	Family	–
–	Time Is...	Raw Material	
–	Friendship	Junipher Greene	Debut Double album. Excellent band from Norway
–	5'll Getcha Ten	Cowboy	-
–	Collage	Le Orme	
–	Bloodrock U.S.A.	Bloodrock	–
–	Brand New Morning	Bob Seger	–
–	Camembert Electrique	Gong	-
–	Country Anthem	Hoyt Axton	–
–	Focus II (Moving Waves)	Focus	–
–	Fog on the Tyne	Lindisfarne	–
–	Frisco Mabel Joy	Mickey Newbury	–
–	Gather Me	Melanie	–
–	Greatest Hits, Volume Two	B.J. Thomas	Compilation
–	Growers of Mushroom	Leaf Hound	–
–	Illusion	Renaissance	–
–	Jesse Frederick	Jesse Frederick	–
–	John Prine	John Prine	–
–	The King of Rock and Roll	Little Richard	–
–	Liquid Acrobat as Regards the Air	Incredible String Band	–
–	Live at PJ's	Kool & the Gang	–
–	The Marblehead Messenger	Seatrain	–
–	Memories	John Mayall	–
–	The Morning After	The J. Geils Band	–
–	No Roses	Shirley Collins and the Albion Country Band	–
–	Rainbow Bridge	Jimi Hendrix	Soundtrack
–	Reflection	Pentangle	–
–	R.E.O. Speedwagon	REO Speedwagon	Debut
–	Roots	Curtis Mayfield	–
–	Rotten to the Core	Crabby Appleton	–
–	Smackwater Jack	Quincy Jones	-
–	Stoney & Meatloaf	Stoney & Meat Loaf	–
–	To You with Love, Donny	Donny Osmond	–
–	UFO 2: Flying	UFO	–
–	War War War	Country Joe McDonald	–

=== November ===
Day	Album	Artist	Notes
1	Black Moses	Isaac Hayes	–
1	Cold Spring Harbor	Billy Joel	Debut
1	There's a Riot Goin' On	Sly & the Family Stone	–
1	Footprint	Gary Wright	–
1	Hooteroll?	Howard Wales and Jerry Garcia	–
1	If Not for You	Olivia Newton-John	Debut
1	Rock Messiah	David Axelrod	–
3	The Inner Mounting Flame	Mahavishnu Orchestra	Debut
5	Barclay James Harvest and Other Short Stories	Barclay James Harvest	–
5	Dog of Two Head	Status Quo	–
5	Meddle	Pink Floyd	UK
5	Madman Across the Water	Elton John	–
5	Stones	Neil Diamond	-
6	The Stylistics	The Stylistics	–
8	I Wrote a Simple Song	Billy Preston	–
8	The Land of Many Churches	Merle Haggard	-
8	Led Zeppelin IV	Led Zeppelin	Also known as "Four Symbols" or "Untitled"
9	Killer	Alice Cooper	–
11	Nilsson Schmilsson	Harry Nilsson	–
12	Fragile	Yes	UK
12	Nursery Cryme	Genesis	–
12	Pawn Hearts	Van der Graaf Generator	–
12	Nazareth	Nazareth	Debut
15	Asylum Choir II	Leon Russell and Marc Benno	–
15	E Pluribus Funk	Grand Funk Railroad	–
17	Bob Dylan's Greatest Hits Vol. II	Bob Dylan	Compilation + new and unreleased material
17	Farther Along	The Byrds	–
17	Gonna Take a Miracle	Laura Nyro	–
17	Live-Evil	Miles Davis	–
17	A Nod Is As Good As a Wink... to a Blind Horse	Faces	–
19	Brain Capers	Mott the Hoople	–
24	Muswell Hillbillies	The Kinks	–
20	Kazemachi Roman	Happy End	–
26	Funny How Sweet Co-Co Can Be	Sweet	Debut
26	The Low Spark of High Heeled Boys	Traffic	–
28	Deuce	Rory Gallagher	
–	Aerie	John Denver	–
–	All Day Music	War	–
–	Anne Murray / Glen Campbell	Anne Murray and Glen Campbell	–
–	Anticipation	Carly Simon	–
–	"Babbacombe" Lee	Fairport Convention	–
–	Beautiful Lies You Could Live In	Pearls Before Swine	–
–	Bless the Weather	John Martyn	–
–	Bonnie Raitt	Bonnie Raitt	–
–	Choice Quality Stuff/Anytime	It's a Beautiful Day	–
–	Coming From Reality	Sixto Rodriguez	–
–	Do You Like It Here Now, Are You Settling In?	Man	-
–	Flowers of Evil	Mountain	–
–	For Ladies Only	Steppenwolf	–
–	Good and Dusty	The Youngbloods	–
–	Jonathan Edwards	Jonathan Edwards	–
–	Journey to the Centre of the Eye	Nektar	-
–	Lay it All Out	Barry Mann	–
–	Liv	Livingston Taylor	–
–	Living	Judy Collins	–
–	The Lonesome Picker Rides Again	John Stewart	–
–	Lost in the Ozone	Commander Cody and His Lost Planet Airmen	–
–	Meaty Beaty Big and Bouncy	The Who	Compilation
–	The Need of Love	Earth, Wind & Fire	–
–	Nice Feelin'	Rita Coolidge	–
–	'Nuff Said	Ike & Tina Turner	–
–	One Year	Colin Blunstone	Debut
–	A Partridge Family Christmas Card	The Partridge Family	-
–	People Like Us	The Mamas & the Papas	–
–	Performance Rockin' the Fillmore	Humble Pie	Live
–	Pictures at an Exhibition	Emerson, Lake & Palmer	–
–	Quicksilver	Quicksilver Messenger Service	–
–	Quiet Fire	Roberta Flack	–
–	Released	Jade Warrior	-
–	Sanctuary	Dion	–
–	Shake Off the Demon	Brewer & Shipley	–
–	Sittin' In	Loggins and Messina	Debut
–	Sunfighter	Paul Kantner and Grace Slick	–
–	There's Gotta Be a Change	Albert Collins	–
–	Whatevershebringswesing	Kevin Ayers	–
–	Year of Sunday	Seals and Crofts	-

=== December ===
Day	Album	Artist	Notes
3	The Electric Light Orchestra	Electric Light Orchestra	Debut
3	Islands	King Crimson	–
3	Wild Life	Wings	Debut
9	Greatest Hits	The Jackson 5	Compilation
12	Flute-In	Bobbi Humphrey	Debut
13	Straight Up	Badfinger	US
17	Hunky Dory	David Bowie	–
20	The Concert for Bangladesh	George Harrison and Friends	Live
20	Hot Rocks 1964–1971	The Rolling Stones	Compilation
20	Live	UFO	Live
–	Astral Taxi	Tin Tin	-
–	This is...Gracious!!	Gracious!	Philips Records
–	Fairyport	Wigwam	
–	(A Ballad of) A Peaceful Man	Gravy Train	-
–	The Best of Top of the Pops '71	Top of the Poppers	Compilation
–	Black Unity	Pharoah Sanders	-
–	Boz Scaggs & Band	Boz Scaggs	–
–	Don't Knock My Love	Wilson Pickett	–
–	Dynamite!	The Supremes and the Four Tops	–
–	Guilty!	Eric Burdon & Jimmy Witherspoon	–
–	High, Low and In Between	Townes van Zandt	–
–	Message from a Drum	Redbone	–
–	Music	Carole King	–
–	Papa John Creach	Papa John Creach	–
–	Rare Earth in Concert	Rare Earth	-
–	Soulful Tapestry	Honey Cone	-
–	Ten Man Mop, or Mr. Reservoir Butler Rides Again	Steeleye Span	–

=== Release date unknown ===
- 1969 – Julie Driscoll
- 2 + 2 + 1 = Ponderosa Twins Plus One – Ponderosa Twins Plus One
- Afrique – Count Basie
- Alarm Clock – Richie Havens
- All for the Love of Sunshine – Hank Williams, Jr.
- America – John Fahey
- Another Cycle – Jimmy Cliff
- Assagai – Assagai
- Back to the Roots – Ramsey Lewis
- Bang – Bang
- Barefoot Boy – Larry Coryell
- A Better Road – Steel River
- The Bill Evans Album – Bill Evans
- Black Rhythm Revolution! – Idris Muhammad
- Black Seeds – The Main Ingredient
- Blackstone Legacy – Woody Shaw
- Black Widow – Black Widow
- Blue Memphis – Memphis Slim
- Blue Mitchell – Blue Mitchell
- Boogie Woogie – Memphis Slim
- Born with the Blues – Memphis Slim
- The Brand New Z.Z. Hill – Z.Z. Hill
- Brave Belt – Brave Belt
- Breakout – Johnny "Hammond" Smith
- Can I Have My Money Back? – Gerry Rafferty
- Captain Buckles – David "Fathead" Newman
- Chequered! – Chubby Checker
- Closer to the Ground – Joy of Cooking
- Cluster – Cluster
- Constant Throb – John Klemmer
- Davy Jones – Davy Jones
- Danny O'Keefe – Danny O'Keefe
- Detroit – Mitch Ryder
- The Dionne Warwicke Story – Dionne Warwick
- Do Me Right – The Detroit Emeralds
- Double Back – Happy and Artie Traum
- Doug Kershaw – Doug Kershaw
- Earth Song, Ocean Song – Mary Hopkin
- Edgar Winter's White Trash – Edgar Winter
- El derecho de vivir en paz – Víctor Jara
- Eruption – Kluster
- Escalator over the Hill – Carla Bley & Paul Haines
- Every Little Bit Soul – Rosetta Hightower
- Exposed – Valerie Simpson
- Fame and Price, Price and Fame: Together! – Alan Price and Georgie Fame
- The Family – Mashmakhan
- Fela's London Scene – Fela Kuti
- Fire Eater – Rusty Bryant
- First Utterance – Comus
- Fraser & DeBolt – Fraser & DeBolt
- Freeflight – Ahmad Jamal
- Funk, Inc. – Funk, Inc.
- The Fuzz – The Fuzz
- Fuzzy Duck – Fuzzy Duck
- Gemini Suite – Jon Lord
- Getting Ready – Freddie King
- Gila – Gila
- God Bless the Child – Kenny Burrell
- Goin' Down Highway 51 – John Lee Hooker
- Going East – Billy Paul
- The Good Book – Melanie
- Groove Grease – Jimmy McGriff
- The Gypsy – Mr. Fox
- Happy Just to Be Like I Am – Taj Mahal
- Have a Nice Day – Count Basie
- Headless Heroes of the Apocalypse – Gene McDaniels
- High on a Hilltop – Merle Haggard
- Hightower – Rosetta Hightower
- High Winds, White Sky – Bruce Cockburn
- The Hills of Indiana – Lonnie Mack
- Hold Your Fire – Patto
- Home is in My Head – Jackie Lomax
- Houston Express – Houston Person
- Ian & Sylvia – Ian & Sylvia
- I Am What I Am – Ruth Copeland
- Illusion – Renaissance
- In God We Trust – Don Nix
- In My Own Time – Karen Dalton
- In Search of a Song – Tom T. Hall
- Isle of View – Jimmie Spheeris
- I've Got a Right to Cry – Hank Williams Jr.
- Jade Warrior – Jade Warrior
- Joe South – Joe South
- Johnny Cash & Jerry Lee Lewis Sing Hank Williams – Johnny Cash & Jerry Lee Lewis
- Joy of Cooking – Joy of Cooking
- Landfall – Martin Carthy
- Larry Coryell at the Village Gate – Larry Coryell
- Lazarus – The Blues Project
- Lazarus – Lazarus
- Live at Topanga Corral – Canned Heat
- Live in Seattle – John Coltrane
- Lift Every Voice and Sing – Max Roach
- Living by the Days – Don Nix
- Losers Weepers – Etta James
- Mad Man Blues – John Lee Hooker
- Madura – Madura
- Mama Wailer – Lonnie Smith
- The Man, The World, His Music – Johnny Cash
- Mark-Almond – Mark-Almond
- Mogul Thrash – Mogul Thrash
- Morning, Noon & the Nite-Liters – The Nite-Liters
- Mr. Big Stuff – Jean Knight
- Mudlark – Leo Kottke
- Na Poi – Fela Kuti
- Natural Black Inventions: Root Strata – Rahsaan Roland Kirk
- New World in the Morning – Roger Whittaker
- Oblivion Express – Brian Auger
- Oh What a Feeling – Crowbar
- One Fine Morning – Lighthouse
- Open & Close – Fela Kuti
- Operation – Birth Control
- Pass the Plate – The Crusaders
- Peace and Rhythm – Idris Muhammad
- Peculiar Friends – Ten Wheel Drive
- Pepper's Pow Wow – Jim Pepper
- Peter Allen – Peter Allen
- Petula '71 – Petula Clark
- The Philosophy of the Spiritual – Richard Davis
- Piano Improvisations Vol. 1 – Chick Corea
- Pictures of Infinity – Sun Ra
- Pieces of a Man – Gil Scott-Heron
- Pins in It – The Human Instinct
- Purdie Good! – Bernard Purdie
- Put Your Hand in the Hand – Ocean
- Rainbow Race – Pete Seeger
- The Real Thing – Taj Mahal
- The Return of Doug Saldaña – Sir Douglas Quintet
- Rock Around the Country – Bill Haley & His Comets
- Rosa dos Ventos – Maria Bethânia
- St. Radigunds – Spirogyra
- Sam, Hard and Heavy – Sam Samudio
- Salt Song – Stanley Turrentine
- Second Movement – Eddie Harris and Les McCann
- Second Opinion – Marvin, Welch & Farrar
- Sergio Franchi – Sergio Franchi (Metromedia album)
- Set Us Free – Reuben Wilson
- Signals – Mal Waldron
- Sinatra & Company – Frank Sinatra
- Sing a Sad Song – Merle Haggard
- Sir Lord Baltimore – Sir Lord Baltimore
- The Song of My Life – Petula Clark
- Song of the Stallion – Robbie Basho
- Songs – Jackie DeShannon
- So the Seeds are Growing – Joe South
- Soul Revolution Part II – Bob Marley and the Wailers
- Source Point – John Hammond
- Southern Delight – Barefoot Jerry
- Spark Plug – Melvin Sparks
- Stand by Me (Whatcha See Is Whatcha Get) – Bernard Purdie
- Stand By Your Man – Candi Staton
- Stoneground – Stoneground
- Super Bad – James Brown
- Sweathog – Sweathog
- Synergy – Glass Harp
- Takin' My Time – Charlie Musselwhite
- Tears of Joy – Don Ellis
- They Call Me Muddy Waters – Muddy Waters
- Third World War – Third World War
- Thoughts of Movin' On – Lighthouse
- Through the Eyes of a Horn – Jim Horn
- Tightly Knit – Climax Blues Band
- Today – Petula Clark
- Tom Jones Sings She's a Lady – Tom Jones
- Tony Joe White – Tony Joe White
- Travelin' Lady – Rosalie Sorrels
- Une vie – Dalida
- Watcha Gonna Do – Denny Doherty
- Wa-Tu-Wa-Zui (Beautiful People) – Charles Kynard
- Western Man – Mose Allison
- What's Going On – Johnny "Hammond" Smith
- Where's the Money? – Dan Hicks and his Hot Licks (Live)
- Why Black Man Dey Suffer – Fela Kuti
- Willie Nelson and Family – Willie Nelson
- Words and Music – Benny Hill
- Woyaya – Osibisa
- You Don't Have to Be in the Army – Mungo Jerry
- You're Not Alone – Dion DiMucci
- You're So Beautiful – Charles Wright & the Watts 103rd Street Rhythm Band
- Your Daily Gift – The Savage Rose
- You Well-Meaning Brought Me Here – Ralph McTell
- Zwei-Osterei – Kluster

== Biggest hit singles ==
The following songs achieved the highest chart positions in the charts of 1971.

#	Artist	Title	Year	Country	Chart entries
1	George Harrison	My Sweet Lord	1970	UK	UK 1 – Jan 1971, US BB 1 – Dec 1970, Canada 1 – Nov 1970, Netherlands 1 – Dec 1970, France 1 – Mar 1971, Switzerland 1 – Jan 1971, Norway 1 – Feb 1971, Germany 1 – Jan 1971, Éire 1 – Jan 1971, Australia 1 for 8 weeks Jul 1971, Australia Goset 1 – Jan 1971, Australia 2 of 1971, RYM 3 of 1970, Italy 4 of 1971, Virgin 5, Poland 7 – Feb 2002, DDD 11 of 1970, Global 33 (5 M sold) – 1970, Germany 40 of the 1970s, US CashBox 70 of 1971, Europe 93 of the 1970s, OzNet 170, WXPN 339, Rolling Stone 454, TheQ 484, Acclaimed 604
2	John Lennon	Imagine	1971	UK	UK 1 – Dec 1980, Éire 1 – Dec 1975, Australia 1 for 5 weeks Jul 1972, Australia Goset 1 – Dec 1971, Virgin 1, OzNet 1, Switzerland 2 – Nov 1971, DDD 2 of 1971, WXPN 2, US BB 3 – Oct 1971, Canada 3 – Sep 1971, Norway 3 – Feb 1972, Italy 3 of 1972, Rolling Stone 3, RYM 4 of 1971, Netherlands 5 – Nov 1971, France 5 – Nov 1971, South Africa 5 of 1972, POP 5 of 1971, Austria 6 – Mar 1981, Europe 8 of the 1970s, TheQ 9, US BB 10 of 1971, Belgium 11 of all time, Germany 12 – Jan 1981, TOTP 16, Poland 17 of all time, Sweden (alt) 19 – Dec 1975, Australia 19 of 1972, Acclaimed 21, RIAA 30, Scrobulate 33 of classic rock, 86 in 2FM list
3	Rod Stewart	Maggie May	1971	UK	UK 1 – Sep 1971, US BB 1 – Aug 1971, Canada 1 – Aug 1971, Australia 1 for 4 weeks May 1972, Australia Goset 1 – Oct 1971, Peel list 1 of 1970, Netherlands 3 – Oct 1971, RYM 3 of 1971, Switzerland 5 – Dec 1971, DDD 5 of 1971, US BB 6 of 1971, France 10 – Nov 1971, POP 10 of 1971, Australia 13 of 1971, Germany 17 – Jan 1972, US CashBox 23 of 1971, TheQ 37, Virgin 53, Acclaimed 80, Rolling Stone 130, OzNet 149, RIAA 194, WXPN 218
4	Lynn Anderson	Rose Garden	1970	US	Canada 1 – Dec 1970, Switzerland 1 – Mar 1971, Norway 1 – Mar 1971, Germany 1 – Mar 1971, Éire 1 – Mar 1971, Australia 1 for 4 weeks Oct 1971, Netherlands 2 – Jan 1971, France 2 – Apr 1971, Australia Goset 2 – Feb 1971, UK 3 – Feb 1971, US BB 3 – Dec 1970, US CashBox 6 of 1971, Germany 50 of the 1970s, DDD 57 of 1970, RYM 75 of 1970, Acclaimed 1217
5	The Rolling Stones	Brown Sugar	1971	UK	US BB 1 – May 1971, Canada 1 – May 1971, Netherlands 1 – May 1971, Switzerland 1 – May 1971, UK 2 – Apr 1971, US BB 3 of 1971, POP 3 of 1971, Norway 4 – May 1971, Germany 5 – May 1971, Australia Goset 5 – Jun 1971, DDD 8 of 1971, France 9 – Apr 1971, RYM 11 of 1971, Virgin 21, US CashBox 38 of 1971, TheQ 82, Scrobulate 89 of classic rock, Acclaimed 137, Germany 249 of the 1970s, WXPN 274, OzNet 412, Rolling Stone 490

== Top 40 Chart hit singles ==
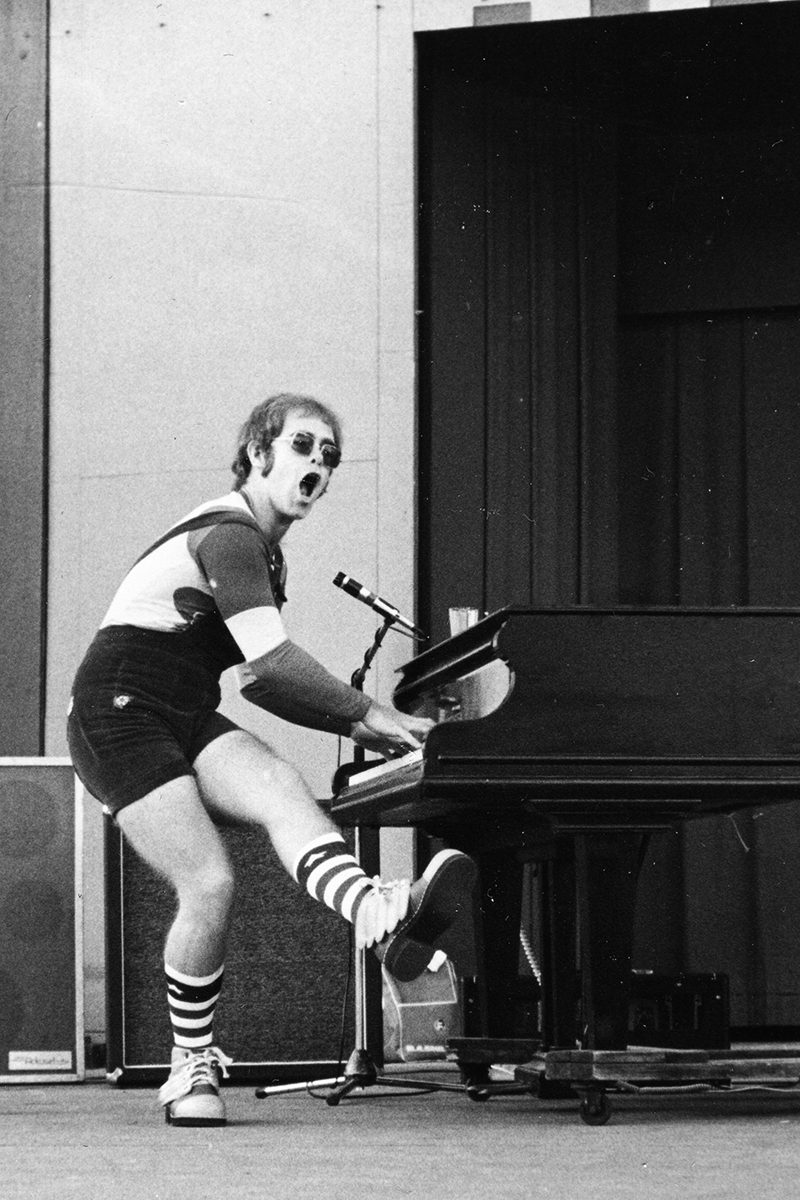
Elton John in 1971

Song title	Artist(s)	Release date(s)	US	UK	Highest chart position	Other Chart Performance(s)
"Ain't No Sunshine"	Bill Withers	July 1971	3	n/a	3 (United States)	See chart performance entry
"All I Ever Need Is You"	Sonny & Cher	October 1971	7	8	5 (Canada)	See chart performance entry
"American Pie"	Don McLean	October 1971	1	2	1 (Australia, Canada, United States, New Zealand)	See chart performance entry
"Another Day"	Paul McCartney	February 1971	5	2	1 (Australia, Ireland, Spain)	See chart performance entry
"Baby I'm-a Want You"	Bread	October 1971	3	14	3 (United States)	See chart performance entry
"Baby Jump"	Mungo Jerry	February 1971	n/a	1	1 (United Kingdom, New Zealand)	4 (Germany) - 5 (Ireland)
"Bangla Desh"	George Harrison	July 1971	23	10	2 (Switzerland)	See chart performance entry
"Banks of the Ohio"	Olivia Newton-John	October 1971	94	6	1 (Australia)	See chart performance entry
"The Banner Man"	Blue Mink	May 1971	n/a	3	1 (Malaysia)	See chart performance entry
"Beginnings"	Chicago	June 1971	7	n/a	7 (United States)	See chart performance entry
"Behind Blue Eyes"	The Who	November 1971	34	n/a	23 (Canada)	See chart performance entry
"Birds of a Feather"	The Raiders	August 1971	23	n/a	10 (Canada)	See chart performance entry
"Black Dog"	Led Zeppelin	December 1971	15	n/a	5 (Denmark)	See chart performance entry
"Black Magic Woman"	Santana	November 1970	4	n/a	4 (Canada, United States)	See chart performance entry
"Blue Money"	Van Morrison	January 1971	23	n/a	13 (Canada)	See chart performance entry
"Brand New Key"	Melanie	October 1971	1	4	1 (5 countries)	See chart performance entry
"Brandy"	Scott English	October 1971	91	12	12 (United Kingdom)	See chart performance entry
"Brown Sugar/Bitch/Let It Rock"	The Rolling Stones	April 1971	1	2	1 (4 countries)	See chart performance entry
"Butterfly"	Danyel Gérard	May 1971	78	n/a	1 (Germany)	See chart performance entry
"Cherish"	David Cassidy	October 1971	9	2	1 (Australia, United Kingdom)	See chart performance entry
"Chick-A-Boom (Don't Ya Jes' Love It)"	Daddy Dewdrop	March 1971	9	n/a	2 (Canada)	See chart performance entry
"Chirpy Chirpy Cheep Cheep"	Middle of the Road	October 1970	n/a	1	1 (9 countries)	See chart performance entry
"Chirpy Chirpy Cheep Cheep"	Mac and Katie Kissoon	May 1971	20	41	10 (Canada)	See chart performance entry
"Co-Co"	The Sweet	June 1971	99	2	1 (5 countries)	See chart performance entry
"Colour My World"	Chicago	June 1971	7	n/a	7 (United States)	See chart performance entry
"Come Back Again"	Daddy Cool	September 1971	n/a	n/a	3 (Australia)	See chart performance entry
"(Come 'Round Here) I'm the One You Need"	Smokey Robinson and The Miracles	October 1971	n/a	n/a	13 (United Kingdom)	See chart performance entry
"Country Road"	James Taylor	February 1971	37	n/a	19 (Canada)	See chart performance entry
"Coz I Luv You"	Slade	October 1971	n/a	n/a	1 (United Kingdom)	See chart performance entry
"Crazy Love"	Helen Reddy	May 1971	51	n/a	35 (Canada)	See chart performance entry
"Cried Like a Baby"	Bobby Sherman	February 1971	16	n/a	11 (Canada)	See chart performance entry
"Daddy Don't You Walk So Fast"	Daniel Boone	July 1971	n/a	n/a	1 (New Zealand)	See chart performance entry
"Day After Day"	Badfinger	November 1971	4	n/a	2 (Canada)	See chart performance entry
"Desiderata"	Les Crane	September 1971	8	n/a	4 (United Kingdom)	See chart performance entry
"Did You Ever...?"	Nancy Sinatra and Lee Hazlewood	July 1971	n/a	n/a	2 (United Kingdom)	See chart performance entry
"Do Me Right"	The Detroit Emeralds	February 1971	43	n/a	43 (United States)	See chart performance entry
"Do You Know What I Mean"	Lee Michaels	July 1971	6	n/a	4 (Canada)	See chart performance entry
"Doesn't Somebody Want to Be Wanted"	The Partridge Family	February 1971	6	n/a	1 (Canada)	See chart performance entry
"Don't Knock My Love, Part 1"	Wilson Pickett	April 1971	13	n/a	13 (United States)	See chart performance entry
"Don't Let It Die"	Hurricane Smith	June 1971	n/a	n/a	2 (United Kingdom)	See chart performance entry
"Don't Pull Your Love"	Hamilton, Joe Frank & Reynolds	April 1971	4	n/a	1 (Canada)	See chart performance entry
"Double Barrel"	Dave and Ansell Collins	August 1970	22	1	1 (UK)	See chart performance entry
"Draggin' the Line"	Tommy James	May 1971	4	n/a	1 (Canada)	See chart performance entry
"The Drum"	Bobby Sherman	May 1971	29	n/a	7 (Canada)	See chart performance entry
"Eagle Rock"	Daddy Cool	May 1971	n/a	n/a	1 (Australia)	See chart performance entry
"Ernie (The Fastest Milkman in the West)"	Benny Hill	November 1971	n/a	n/a	1 (United Kingdom)	See chart performance entry
"Everything's Tuesday"	Chairmen of the Board	September 1970	38	n/a	12 (United Kingdom)	N/A
"Family Affair"	Sly & the Family Stone	October 1971	1	n/a	1 (United States)	See chart performance entry
"For All We Know"	The Carpenters	January 1971	3	n/a	3 (United States)	See chart performance entry
"Forget Me Not"	Martha and the Vandellas	June 1968	93	n/a	11 (United Kingdom)	See chart performance entry
"Funky Nassau"	The Beginning of the End	February 1971	15	n/a	7 (United States)	See chart performance entry
"Get Down and Get With It"	Slade	May 1971	n/a	n/a	4 (Germany)	See chart performance entry
"Get It On"	T. Rex	July 1971	10	n/a	1 (United Kingdom)	See chart performance entry
"Girls in the City"	The Esquires	July 1971	120	n/a	18 (United States)	N/A
"Go Away Little Girl"	Donny Osmond	July 1971	1	n/a	1 (United States)	See chart performance entry
"Got to Be There"	Michael Jackson	October 1971	4	n/a	1 (United States)	See chart performance entry
"Grandad"	Clive Dunn	November 1970	n/a	n/a	1 (United Kingdom)	See chart performance entry
"Gypsys, Tramps & Thieves"	Cher	September 1971	1	n/a	1 (United States)	See chart performance entry
"The Harder I Try (The Bluer I Get)"	The Free Movement	December 1971	50	n/a	6 (United States)	N/A
"Have You Ever Seen the Rain?"	Creedence Clearwater Revival	December 1970	8	n/a	1 (Canada)	See chart performance entry
"Have You Seen Her"	The Chi-Lites	October 1971	3	n/a	1 (United States)	See chart performance entry
"He's Gonna Step On You Again"	John Kongos	May 1971	70	n/a	2 (South Africa)	See chart performance entry
"Heaven Must Have Sent You"	The Elgins	June 1971	50	n/a	3 (United Kingdom)	See chart performance entry
"Help Me Make It Through the Night"	Sammi Smith	September 1970	8	n/a	1 (United States)	See chart performance entry
"Here Comes That Rainy Day Feeling Again"	The Fortunes	May 1971	15	n/a	15 (United States)	See chart performance entry
"Here Comes the Sun"	Richie Havens	May 1971	16	n/a	16 (United States)	N/A
"Hey Girl Don't Bother Me"	The Tams	July 1971	n/a	n/a	1 (United Kingdom)	See chart performance entry
"Hot Love"	T. Rex	February 1971	72	n/a	1 (United Kingdom)	See chart performance entry
"Hot Pants (She Got to Use What She Got to Get Just What She Wants)"	James Brown	June 1971	15	n/a	15 (United States)	See chart performance entry
"How Can You Mend a Broken Heart"	Bee Gees	May 1971	1	n/a	1 (United States)	See chart performance entry
"I Am...I Said"	Neil Diamond	March 1971	4	n/a	1 (New Zealand)	See chart performance entry
"I Did What I Did for Maria"	Tony Christie	May 1971	n/a	n/a	2 (United Kingdom)	See chart performance entry
"I Don't Blame You at All"	Smokey Robinson and The Miracles	March 1971	18	n/a	11 (United Kingdom)	See chart performance entry
"I Don't Know How to Love Him"	Helen Reddy	January 1971	13	n/a	13 (United States)	See chart performance entry
"I Don't Know How to Love Him" from the original studio cast recording of Jesus Christ Superstar	Yvonne Elliman	January 1971	28	n/a	20 (Canada)	See chart performance entry
"I Don't Want to Do Wrong"	Gladys Knight & the Pips	May 1971	17	n/a	17 (United States)	See chart performance entry
"I Hear You Knocking"	Dave Edmunds	November 1970	4	n/a	1 (United Kingdom)	See chart performance entry
"I Just Can't Help Believing"	Elvis Presley	November 1971	n/a	n/a	6 (United Kingdom)	See chart performance entry
"I Just Want to Celebrate"	Rare Earth	July 1971	7	n/a	7 (United States)	See chart performance entry
"I Love You for All Seasons"	The Fuzz	December 1970	21	n/a	21 (United States)	N/A
"I Say a Little Prayer"	Anne Murray and Glen Campbell	August 1971	81	n/a	81 (United States)	See chart performance entry
"I Woke Up In Love This Morning"	The Partridge Family	August 1971	13	n/a	13 (United States)	See chart performance entry
"I'd Like to Teach the World to Sing (In Perfect Harmony)"	The New Seekers	November 1971	7	n/a	1 (United Kingdom)	See chart performance entry
"I'll Be Gone"	Spectrum	January 1971	n/a	n/a	1 (Australia)	See chart performance entry
"I'll Meet You Halfway"	The Partridge Family	May 1971	9	n/a	9 (United States)	See chart performance entry
"I'm Eighteen"	Alice Cooper	November 1970	21	n/a	21 (United States)	See chart performance entry
"I'm Gonna Run Away From You"	Tami Lynn	April 1971	n/a	n/a	4 (United Kingdom)	N/A
"(I Know) I'm Losing You"	Rod Stewart	October 1971	24	n/a	24 (United States)	See chart performance entry
"I'm Still Waiting"	Diana Ross	April 1971	63	n/a	1 (United Kingdom)	See chart performance entry
"I've Found Someone of My Own"	The Free Movement	March 1971	5	n/a	5 (United States)	N/A
"If"	Bread	March 1971	4	n/a	4 (United States)	See chart performance entry
"If I Were Your Woman"	Gladys Knight & the Pips	November 1970	9	n/a	9 (United States)	See chart performance entry
"If Not For You"	Olivia Newton-John	March 1971	25	n/a	6 (Australia)	See chart performance entry
"If You Could Read My Mind"	Gordon Lightfoot	December 1970	5	n/a	1 (Canada)	See chart performance entry
"If You Really Love Me"	Stevie Wonder	August 1971	8	n/a	8 (United States)	See chart performance entry
"Imagine"	John Lennon	October 1971	3	n/a	1 (Canada)	See chart performance entry
"In My Own Time"	Family	June 1971	n/a	n/a	4 (United Kingdom)	See chart performance entry
"Indian Reservation"	Paul Revere & the Raiders	February 1971	1	n/a	1 (United States)	See chart performance entry
"Indiana Wants Me"	R. Dean Taylor	August 1970	5	n/a	2 (Canada)	See chart performance entry
"Is This the Way to Amarillo"	Tony Christie	November 1971	n/a	n/a	1 (Germany)	See chart performance entry
"It Don't Come Easy"	Ringo Starr	April 1971	4	n/a	1 (Canada)	See chart performance entry
"It's Impossible"	Perry Como	November 1970	10	n/a	4 (United Kingdom)	See chart performance entry
"It's The Same Old Song"	The Weathermen	February 1971	n/a	n/a	19 (United Kingdom)	N/A
"It's Too Late"	Carole King	April 1971	1	n/a	1 (United States)	See chart performance entry
"It Takes Time"	Anne Murray	April 1971	n/a	n/a	1 (Canada)	See chart performance entry
"Jack in the Box"	Clodagh Rodgers	March 1971	n/a	n/a	2 (Ireland)	See chart performance entry
"Jeepster"	T. Rex	November 1971	n/a	n/a	2 (United Kingdom)	See chart performance entry
"Joy to the World"	Three Dog Night	February 1971	1	n/a	1 (United States)	See chart performance entry
"Just My Imagination (Running Away with Me)"	The Temptations	January 1971	1	n/a	1 (United States)	See chart performance entry
"K- Jee"	The Nite- Liters, see (New Birth)	May 1971	39	n/a	39 (United States)	N/A
"Knock Three Times"	Tony Orlando and Dawn	November 1970	1	n/a	1 (United States)	See chart performance entry
"L.A. International Airport"	Susan Raye	March 1971	54	n/a	2 (New Zealand)	See chart performance entry
"L.A. Woman"	The Doors	April 1971	n/a	n/a	n/a	See chart performance entry
"Let Your Yeah Be Yeah"	The Pioneers	July 1971	n/a	n/a	5 (United Kingdom)	See chart performance entry
"Levon"	Elton John	November 1971	24	n/a	6 (Canada)	See chart performance entry
"Liar"	Three Dog Night	July 1971	7	n/a	4 (Canada)	See chart performance entry
"Light Sings"	The 5th Dimension	March 1971	44	n/a	44 (United States)	N/A
"Like an Open Door"	The Fuzz	May 1971	77	n/a	77 (United States)	N/A
"Locomotive Breath"	Jethro Tull	March 1971	n/a	n/a	n/a	See chart performance entry
"Lonely Days"	Bee Gees	November 1970	3	n/a	1 (Canada)	See chart performance entry
"Look Wot You Dun"	Slade	January 1972	n/a	n/a	4 (United Kingdom)	See chart performance entry
"Love Her Madly"	The Doors	March 1971	11	n/a	3 (Canada)	See chart performance entry
"Love the One You're With"	Stephen Stills	November 1970	14	n/a	14 (United States)	See chart performance entry
"Love's Lines, Angles and Rhymes"	The 5th Dimension	February 1971	19	n/a	19 (United States)	See chart performance entry
"Maggie May"	Rod Stewart	July 1971	1	n/a	1 (United Kingdom)	See chart performance entry
"Make It with You"	Sacha Distel	November 1970	n/a	n/a	10 (United Kingdom)	See chart performance entry
"Mama's Pearl"	The Jackson 5	January 1971	2	n/a	2 (United States)	See chart performance entry
"Me and Bobby McGee"	Janis Joplin	January 1971	1	n/a	1 (United States)	See chart performance entry
"Me and My Arrow"	Harry Nilsson	February 1971	34	n/a	34 (United States)	See chart performance entry
"Me and You and a Dog Named Boo"	Lobo	March 1971	5	n/a	1 (New Zealand)	See chart performance entry
"Mercy Mercy Me (The Ecology)"	Marvin Gaye	June 1971	4	n/a	4 (United States)	See chart performance entry
"Mighty Clouds of Joy"	B. J. Thomas	April 1971	34	n/a	26 (Canada)	N/A
"Mr. Big Stuff"	Jean Knight	May 1971	2	n/a	2 (United States)	See chart performance entry
"Mr. Bojangles"	Nitty Gritty Dirt Band	November 1970	9	n/a	2 (Canada)	See chart performance entry
"Mozart Symphony No. 40 in G minor K550 1st movement (Allegro molto)"	Waldo de los Ríos	December 1970	67	n/a	1 (Netherlands)	See chart performance entry
"My Brother Jake"	Free	April 1971	n/a	n/a	4 (United Kingdom)	See chart performance entry
"My Sweet Lord"	George Harrison	November 1970	1	n/a	1 (United Kingdom)	See chart performance entry
"Nathan Jones"	The Supremes	April 1971	16	n/a	5 (United Kingdom)	See chart performance entry
"Never Can Say Goodbye"	The Jackson 5	March 1971	2	n/a	2 (United States)	See chart performance entry
"Never Ending Song of Love"	The New Seekers	June 1971	67	n/a	2 (United Kingdom)	See chart performance entry
"The Night They Drove Old Dixie Down"	Joan Baez	July 1971	3	1	1 (United States)	See chart performance entry
"No Matter What"	Badfinger	October 1970	8	6	5 (United Kingdom)	See chart performance entry
"An Old Fashioned Love Song"	Three Dog Night	November 1971	4	4	2 (Canada)	See chart performance entry
"One Bad Apple"	The Osmonds	November 1970	1	1	1 (United States)	See chart performance entry
"One Less Bell to Answer"	The 5th Dimension	October 1970	2	2	2 (United States)	See chart performance entry
"One Man Band"	Three Dog Night	November 1970	19	11	11 (United States)	See chart performance entry
"One Monkey Don't Stop No Show (Part 1)"	Honey Cone	November 1971	15	12	15 (United States)	See chart performance entry
"One Tin Soldier"	Coven	September 1971	26	22	6 (Canada)	See chart performance entry
"One Toke Over the Line"	Brewer & Shipley	February 1971	10	8	5 (Canada)	See chart performance entry
"Only You Know and I Know"	Delaney and Bonnie	May 1971	20	17	6 (Canada)	See chart performance entry
"Oye Como Va"	Santana	February 1971	13	11	13 (United States)	See chart performance entry
"Paint It Black"	Eric Burdon & War	December 1970	n/a	n/a	31 (Netherlands)	See chart performance entry
"The Pied Piper"	Bob and Marcia	May 1971	n/a	n/a	11 (United Kingdom)	See chart performance entry
"Power to the People"	John Lennon/Plastic Ono Band	March 1971	11	10	6 (United Kingdom)	See chart performance entry
"Proud Mary"	Ike & Tina Turner	January 1971	4	5	4 (United States)	See chart performance entry
"The Pushbike Song"	The Mixtures	December 1970	44	37	1 (Australia)	See chart performance entry
"Rain Dance"	The Guess Who	July 1971	19	14	3 (Canada)	See chart performance entry
"Rainy Days and Mondays"	The Carpenters	May 1971	2	2	1 (Canada)	See chart performance entry
"Remember Me"	Diana Ross	December 1970	16	10	7 (United Kingdom)	See chart performance entry
"The Resurrection Shuffle"	Ashton, Gardner and Dyke	January 1971	40	22	3 (United Kingdom)	See chart performance entry
"Ride a White Swan"	T. Rex	October 1970	76	58	2 (United Kingdom)	See chart performance entry
"Riders on the Storm"	The Doors	June 1971	14	12	5 (Canada)	See chart performance entry
"Right on the Tip of My Tongue"	Brenda & the Tabulations	April 1971	23	19	23 (United States)	N/A
"River Deep – Mountain High"	The Supremes and Four Tops	November 1970	14	15	11 (United Kingdom)	See chart performance entry
"Rock and Roll"	Led Zeppelin	November 1971	47	42	38 (Canada)	See chart performance entry
"Rock Steady"	Aretha Franklin	October 1971	9	7	9 (United States)	See chart performance entry
"Rose Garden"	Lynn Anderson	October 1970	3	2	1 (Australia)	See chart performance entry
"Run, Baby Run (Back Into My Arms)"	The Newbeats	September 1965	12	10	10 (United Kingdom)	See chart performance entry
"She's a Lady"	Tom Jones	January 1971	2	1	1 (Canada)	See chart performance entry
"She's Not Just Another Woman"	8th Day	March 1971	11	8	11 (United States)	N/A
"Signs"	Five Man Electrical Band	May 1971	3	4	3 (United States)	See chart performance entry
"Sing High, Sing Low"	Anne Murray	November 1970	83	90	4 (Canada)	See chart performance entry
"Smiling Faces Sometimes"	Undisputed Truth	April 1971	3	2	3 (United States)	See chart performance entry
"So Far Away"	Carole King	April 1971	14	11	14 (United States)	See chart performance entry
"Softly Whispering I Love You"	The Congregation	November 1971	29	24	4 (United Kingdom)	See chart performance entry
"Soldier Blue"	Buffy Sainte-Marie	August 1970	n/a	n/a	7 (United Kingdom)	See chart performance entry
"Soley, Soley"	Middle of the Road	August 1971	n/a	n/a	1 (Netherlands)	See chart performance entry
"Something Old, Something New"	The Fantastics	June 1971	102	n/a	9 (United Kingdom)	See chart performance entry
"Something Tells Me (Something's Gonna Happen Tonight)"	Cilla Black	October 1971	n/a	n/a	3 (United Kingdom)	See chart performance entry
"Sooner or Later"	The Grass Roots	June 1971	9	12	9 (United States)	See chart performance entry
"Spanish Harlem"	Aretha Franklin	July 1971	2	1	2 (United States)	See chart performance entry
"Stay Awhile"	The Bells	March 1971	7	4	1 (Canada)	See chart performance entry
"Stay With Me"	The Faces	December 1971	17	10	6 (United Kingdom)	See chart performance entry
"Stairway to Heaven"	Led Zeppelin	November 1971	n/a	n/a	n/a	See chart performance entry
"Stick Up"	Honey Cone	August 1971	11	11	11 (United States)	See chart performance entry
"Stoned Love"	The Supremes	October 1970	7	5	3 (United Kingdom)	See chart performance entry
"Stoney End"	Barbra Streisand	October 1970	6	7	5 (Canada)	See chart performance entry
"Stop, Look, Listen"	The Stylistics	May 1971	39	35	39 (United States)	See chart performance entry
"A Stranger in My Place"	Anne Murray	December 1970	122	n/a	1 (Canada)	See chart performance entry
"Strange Kind of Woman"	Deep Purple	February 1971	n/a	n/a	8 (United Kingdom)	See chart performance entry
"Sugar, Sugar"	Sakkarin	March 1971	n/a	n/a	12 (United Kingdom)	N/A
"Theme from Summer of '42 (The Summer Knows)"	Peter Nero	July 1971	21	23	21 (United States)	N/A
"Sunny Honey Girl"	Cliff Richard	January 1971	n/a	n/a	9 (United Kingdom)	See chart performance entry
"Superstar"	The Carpenters	August 1971	2	1	2 (United States)	See chart performance entry
""Superstar" (from Jesus Christ Superstar)"	Murray Head	October 1969	14	10	4 (Canada)	See chart performance entry
"Superstar (Remember How You Got Where You Are)"	The Temptations	October 1971	18	9	18 (United States)	See chart performance entry
"Surrender"	Diana Ross	July 1971	38	24	10 (United Kingdom)	See chart performance entry
"Sweet and Innocent"	Donny Osmond	February 1971	7	7	7 (United States)	See chart performance entry
"Sweet City Woman"	The Stampeders	July 1971	8	1	1 (Canada)	See chart performance entry
"Sweet Hitch-Hiker"	Creedence Clearwater Revival	July 1971	6	5	1 (Switzerland)	See chart performance entry
"Sweet Mary"	Wadsworth Mansion	October 1970	7	5	7 (United States)	N/A
"Take Me Home Country Roads"	John Denver and Fat City	April 1971	2	1	2 (United States)	See chart performance entry
"Talk It Over in the Morning"	Anne Murray	July 1971	57	52	1 (Canada)	See chart performance entry
"Tap Turns on the Water"	C.C.S.	August 1971	n/a	n/a	5 (United Kingdom)	See chart performance entry
"Temptation Eyes"	The Grass Roots	December 1970	15	16	15 (United States)	See chart performance entry
"That's the Way I've Always Heard It Should Be"	Carly Simon	April 1971	10	9	10 (United States)	See chart performance entry
"Theme from Shaft"	Isaac Hayes	September 1971	1	1	1 (United States)	See chart performance entry
"They Can't Take Away Our Music"	Eric Burdon & War	November 1970	50	53	35 (Canada)	See chart performance entry
"Thin Line Between Love and Hate"	The Persuaders	July 1971	15	11	15 (United States)	See chart performance entry
"Timothy"	The Buoys	November 1970	17	13	9 (Canada)	See chart performance entry
"Till"	Tom Jones	November 1971	41	33	2 (United Kingdom)	See chart performance entry
"Tiny Dancer"	Elton John	February 1972	41	29	13 (Canada)	See chart performance entry
"Tired of Being Alone"	Al Green	July 1971	11	9	4 (United Kingdom)	See chart performance entry
"Toast and Marmalade for Tea"	Tin Tin	May 1971	20	15	10 (Australia)	See chart performance entry
"Tokoloshe Man"	John Kongos	November 1971	n/a	n/a	4 (United Kingdom)	See chart performance entry
"Treat Her Like a Lady"	Cornelius Brothers & Sister Rose	March 1971	3	4	3 (United States)	See chart performance entry
"Tweedle Dee, Tweedle Dum"	Middle of the Road	March 1971	n/a	n/a	2 (United Kingdom)	See chart performance entry
"Two Divided by Love"	The Grass Roots	September 1971	16	14	16 (United States)	See chart performance entry
"Un banc, un arbre, une rue"	Séverine	March 1971	n/a	n/a	1 (United Kingdom)	See chart performance entry
"Uncle Albert/Admiral Halsey"	Paul and Linda McCartney	August 1971	1	1	1 (United States)	See chart performance entry
"Walking"	C.C.S.	January 1971	95	n/a	7 (United Kingdom)	See chart performance entry
"Want Ads"	Honey Cone	March 1971	1	1	1 (United States)	See chart performance entry
"Watching Scotty Grow"	Bobby Goldsboro	December 1970	11	7	1 (Canada)	See chart performance entry
"We Can Work It Out"	Stevie Wonder	December 1970	13	11	13 (United States)	See chart performance entry
"Wear This Ring (with Love)"	The Detroit Emeralds	November 1970	91	n/a	91 (United States)	N/A
"What Am I Living For"	Ray Charles	November 1971	54	43	54 (United States)	N/A
"Whatcha See Is Whatcha Get"	The Dramatics	June 1971	9	12	9 (United States)	See chart performance entry
"What's Going On"	Marvin Gaye	January 1971	2	1	2 (United States)	See chart performance entry
"What Is Life"	George Harrison	February 1971	10	10	1 (Australia)	See chart performance entry
"When You're Hot, You're Hot"	Jerry Reed	March 1971	9	6	9 (United States)	See chart performance entry
"(Where Do I Begin?) Love Story"	Andy Williams; also Henry Mancini	January 1971	9	7	4 (United Kingdom)	See chart performance entry
"Wild Horses"	the Rolling Stones	June 1971	28	21	11 (Canada)	See chart performance entry
"Wild Night"	Van Morrison	September 1971	28	20	20 (Canada)	See chart performance entry
"Wild World"	Cat Stevens	September 1970	11	15	11 (United States)	See chart performance entry
"The Witch Queen of New Orleans"	Redbone	November 1971	21	22	2 (United Kingdom)	See chart performance entry
"Won't Get Fooled Again"	The Who	June 1971	15	9	9 (United Kingdom)	See chart performance entry
"Yo-Yo"	The Osmonds	September 1971	3	4	1 (Canada)	See chart performance entry
"You Are Everything"	The Stylistics	October 1971	9	10	9 (United States)	See chart performance entry
"Your Move"	Yes	July 1971	40	31	40 (United States)	N/A
"Your Love (Means Everything to Me)"	Charles Wright & the Watts 103rd Street Rhythm Band	February 1971	73	65	73 (United States)	See chart performance entry
"Your Song"	Elton John	October 1970	8	8	2 (United Kingdom)	See chart performance entry
"You're All I Need to Get By"	Aretha Franklin	February 1971	19	14	19 (United States)	See chart performance entry
"You've Got a Friend"	James Taylor	May 1971	1	1	1 (United States)	See chart performance entry
"You've Got to Crawl (Before You Walk)"	8th Day	September 1971	28	n/a	3 (United States R&B)	See chart performance entry|

=== Other Chart hit singles ===
- "Baby I'm-a Want You" – Bread (#5 CAN)
- "Baby Jump" – Mungo Jerry (#1 UK)
- "Back Street Luv" – Curved Air
- "Bangla Desh" – George Harrison
- "Banks of the Ohio" – Olivia Newton-John
- "The Banner Man" – Blue Mink
- "Beginnings" – Chicago (#7 US) (#8 CAN)
- "Behind Blue Eyes" – The Who
- "Birds of a Feather" – The Raiders
- "Black & White" – Greyhound
- "Black Dog" – Led Zeppelin
- "Black Magic Woman" – Santana (#4 CAN)
- "Blue Money" – Van Morrison
- "Brand New Key" – Melanie (#1 CAN)
- "Brandy" – Scott English
- "Bridge over Troubled Water" – Aretha Franklin (#8 CAN)
- "Bring the Boys Home" – Freda Payne
- "Brown Sugar/Bitch/Let It Rock" – the Rolling Stones (#1 CAN)
- "Butterfly" – Danyel Gérard
- "Cherish" – David Cassidy
- "Chick-A-Boom (Don't Ya Jes' Love It)" – Daddy Dewdrop
- "Chirpy Chirpy Cheep Cheep" – Middle of the Road
- "Chirpy Chirpy Cheep Cheep" – Mac and Katie Kissoon (Lally Stott's original was dubbed into French)
- "Co-Co" – The Sweet
- "Colour My World" – Chicago (#7 US)
- "Come Back Again" – Daddy Cool (# 3 Australia)
- "(Come 'Round Here) I'm the One You Need" – Smokey Robinson and The Miracles
- "Country Road" – James Taylor
- "Coz I Luv You" – Slade
- "Crazy Love" – Helen Reddy
- "Cried Like a Baby" – Bobby Sherman
- "Daddy Don't You Walk So Fast" – Daniel Boone
- "Day After Day" – Badfinger
- "Desiderata" – Les Crane
- "Did You Ever...?" – Nancy Sinatra and Lee Hazlewood
- "Do You Know What I Mean" – Lee Michaels
- "Doesn't Somebody Want to Be Wanted" – The Partridge Family
- "Do Me Right" – The Detroit Emeralds
- "Don't Knock My Love, Part 1" – Wilson Pickett
- "Don't Let It Die" – Hurricane Smith
- "Don't Pull Your Love" – Hamilton, Joe Frank & Reynolds
- "Draggin' the Line" – Tommy James
- "The Drum" – Bobby Sherman
- "Eagle Rock"– Daddy Cool (#1 Australia)
- "Ernie (The Fastest Milkman in the West)" – Benny Hill
- "Everything's Tuesday" – Chairmen of the Board
- "Family Affair" – Sly & the Family Stone (#1 US)
- "For All We Know" – The Carpenters
- "Forget Me Not" – Martha and the Vandellas
- "Funky Nassau" – The Beginning of the End
- "Get Down and Get With It" – Slade
- "Get It On" – T. Rex
- "Girls in the City" – The Esquires
- "Go Away Little Girl" – Donny Osmond
- "Got to Be There" – Michael Jackson
- "Grandad" – Clive Dunn
- "Gypsys, Tramps & Thieves" – Cher (#1 US)
- "The Harder I Try (The Bluer I Get)" – The Free Movement
- "Have You Ever Seen the Rain?" – Creedence Clearwater Revival
- "Have You Seen Her" – The Chi-Lites
- "He's Gonna Step On You Again" – John Kongos
- "Heaven Must Have Sent You" – The Elgins
- "Help Me Make It Through the Night" – Sammi Smith
- "Here Comes That Rainy Day Feeling Again" – The Fortunes (#15 US)
- "Here Comes the Sun" – Richie Havens
- "Hey Girl Don't Bother Me" – The Tams
- "Hot Love" – T. Rex
- "Hot Pants (She Got to Use What She Got to Get Just What She Wants)" – James Brown
- "How Can You Mend a Broken Heart" – Bee Gees
- "I Am...I Said" – Neil Diamond
- "I Did What I Did for Maria" – Tony Christie
- "I Don't Blame You at All" – Smokey Robinson and The Miracles
- "I Don't Know How to Love Him" – Helen Reddy
- "I Don't Know How to Love Him" from the original studio cast recording of Jesus Christ Superstar – Yvonne Elliman
- "I Don't Want to Do Wrong" – Gladys Knight & the Pips
- "I Hear You Knocking" – Dave Edmunds (#4 US)
- "I Just Can't Help Believing" – Elvis Presley
- "I Just Want to Celebrate" – Rare Earth (#7 US)
- "I Love You for All Seasons" – The Fuzz
- "I Say a Little Prayer" – Anne Murray and Glen Campbell
- "I Woke Up In Love This Morning" – The Partridge Family (#13 US)
- "I'd Like to Teach the World to Sing (In Perfect Harmony)" – The New Seekers
- "I'll Be Gone" – Spectrum (#1 Australia)
- "I'll Meet You Halfway" – The Partridge Family
- "I'm Eighteen" – Alice Cooper (#21 US)
- "I'm Gonna Run Away From You" – Tami Lynn
- "(I Know) I'm Losing You" – Rod Stewart
- "I'm Still Waiting" – Diana Ross
- "I've Found Someone of My Own" – The Free Movement
- "If" – Bread
- "If I Were Your Woman" – Gladys Knight & the Pips
- "If Not For You" – Olivia Newton-John
- "If You Could Read My Mind" – Gordon Lightfoot
- "If You Really Love Me" – Stevie Wonder
- "Imagine" – John Lennon
- "In My Own Time" – Family
- "Indian Reservation" – Paul Revere & the Raiders
- "Indiana Wants Me" – R. Dean Taylor
- "Is This the Way to Amarillo" – Tony Christie
- "It Don't Come Easy" – Ringo Starr
- "It's Impossible" – Perry Como
- "It's The Same Old Song" – The Weathermen
- "It's Too Late" – Carole King
- "It Takes Time" – Anne Murray
- "Jack in the Box" – Clodagh Rodgers
- "Jeepster" – T. Rex
- "Joy to the World" – Three Dog Night (#1 US)
- "Just My Imagination (Running Away with Me)" – The Temptations
- "K- Jee" – The Nite- Liters, see (New Birth)
- "Knock Three Times" – Tony Orlando and Dawn
- "L.A. International Airport" – Susan Raye
- "L.A. Woman" – The Doors
- "Let Your Yeah Be Yeah" – The Pioneers
- "Levon" – Elton John
- "Liar" – Three Dog Night
- "Light Sings" – The 5th Dimension
- "Like an Open Door" – The Fuzz
- "Locomotive Breath" – Jethro Tull
- "Lonely Days" – Bee Gees
- "Look Wot You Dun" – Slade
- "Love Her Madly" – The Doors
- "Love the One You're With" – Stephen Stills
- "Love's Lines, Angles and Rhymes" – The 5th Dimension
- "Maggie May" – Rod Stewart
- "Make It with You" – Sacha Distel (dubbed)
- "Mama's Pearl" – The Jackson 5
- "Me and Bobby McGee" – Janis Joplin
- "Me and My Arrow" – Harry Nilsson
- "Me and You and a Dog Named Boo" – Lobo
- "Mercy Mercy Me (The Ecology)" – Marvin Gaye
- "Mighty Clouds of Joy" – B. J. Thomas
- "Mr. Big Stuff" – Jean Knight
- "Mr. Bojangles" – Nitty Gritty Dirt Band
- "Mozart Symphony No. 40 in G minor K550 1st movement (Allegro molto)" – Waldo de los Ríos
- "My Brother Jake" – Free
- "My Sweet Lord" – George Harrison (#1 US)
- "Nathan Jones" – The Supremes
- "Never Can Say Goodbye" – The Jackson 5
- "Never Ending Song of Love" – The New Seekers
- "The Night They Drove Old Dixie Down" – Joan Baez
- "No Matter What" – Badfinger
- "An Old Fashioned Love Song" – Three Dog Night
- "One Bad Apple" – The Osmonds
- "One Less Bell to Answer" – The 5th Dimension
- "One Man Band" – Three Dog Night
- "One Monkey Don't Stop No Show (Part 1)" – Honey Cone
- "One Tin Soldier" – Coven
- "One Toke Over the Line" – Brewer & Shipley
- "Only You Know and I Know" – Delaney and Bonnie
- "Oye Como Va" – Santana
- "Paint It Black" – Eric Burdon & War
- "The Pied Piper" – Bob and Marcia
- "Power to the People" – John Lennon/Plastic Ono Band
- "Proud Mary" – Ike & Tina Turner
- "The Pushbike Song" – The Mixtures
- "Rain Dance" – The Guess Who
- "Rainy Days and Mondays" – The Carpenters
- "Remember Me" – Diana Ross
- "The Resurrection Shuffle" – Ashton, Gardner and Dyke
- "Ride a White Swan" – T. Rex
- "Riders on the Storm" – The Doors
- "Right on the Tip of My Tongue" – Brenda & the Tabulations
- "River Deep – Mountain High" – The Supremes and Four Tops
- "Rock and Roll" – Led Zeppelin
- "Rock Steady" – Aretha Franklin
- "Rose Garden" – Lynn Anderson
- "Run, Baby Run (Back Into My Arms)" – The Newbeats
- "She's a Lady" – Tom Jones
- "She's Not Just Another Woman" – 8th Day
- "Signs" – Five Man Electrical Band
- "Sing High, Sing Low" – Anne Murray
- "Smiling Faces Sometimes" – Undisputed Truth
- "So Far Away" – Carole King
- "Softly Whispering I Love You" – The Congregation
- "Soldier Blue" – Buffy Sainte-Marie
- "Soley, Soley" – Middle of the Road
- "Something Old, Something New" – The Fantastics
- "Something Tells Me (Something's Gonna Happen Tonight)" – Cilla Black
- "Sooner or Later" – The Grass Roots
- "Spanish Harlem" – Aretha Franklin
- "Stay Awhile" – The Bells (#1 Canada)
- "Stay With Me" – The Faces
- "Stairway to Heaven" – Led Zeppelin
- "Stick Up" – Honey Cone
- "Stoned Love" – The Supremes
- "Stoney End" – Barbra Streisand
- "Stop, Look, Listen" – The Stylistics
- "A Stranger in My Place" – Anne Murray
- "Strange Kind of Woman" – Deep Purple
- "Sugar, Sugar" – Sakkarin
- "Theme from Summer of '42 (The Summer Knows)" – Peter Nero
- "Sunny Honey Girl" – Cliff Richard
- "Superstar" – The Carpenters
- ""Superstar" (from Jesus Christ Superstar) – Murray Head
- "Superstar (Remember How You Got Where You Are)" – The Temptations
- "Surrender" – Diana Ross
- "Sweet and Innocent" – Donny Osmond
- "Sweet City Woman" – The Stampeders
- "Sweet Hitch-Hiker" – Creedence Clearwater Revival
- "Sweet Mary" – Wadsworth Mansion
- "Take Me Home Country Roads" – John Denver and Fat City
- "Talk It Over in the Morning" – Anne Murray
- "Tap Turns on the Water" – C.C.S.
- "Temptation Eyes" – The Grass Roots
- "That's the Way I've Always Heard It Should Be" – Carly Simon
- "Theme from Shaft" – Isaac Hayes
- "They Can't Take Away Our Music" – Eric Burdon & War
- "Thin Line Between Love and Hate" – The Persuaders
- "Timothy" – The Buoys
- "Till" – Tom Jones
- "Tiny Dancer" – Elton John
- "Tired of Being Alone" – Al Green
- "Toast and Marmalade for Tea" – Tin Tin
- "Tokoloshe Man" – John Kongos
- "Treat Her Like a Lady" – Cornelius Brothers & Sister Rose
- "Tweedle Dee, Tweedle Dum" – Middle of the Road
- "Two Divided by Love" – The Grass Roots
- "Un banc, un arbre, une rue" – Séverine
- "Uncle Albert/Admiral Halsey" – Paul and Linda McCartney
- "Walkin'" – C.C.S.
- "Want Ads" – Honey Cone
- "Watching Scotty Grow" – Bobby Goldsboro
- "We Can Work It Out" – Stevie Wonder
- "Wear This Ring (with Love)" – The Detroit Emeralds
- "What Am I Living For" – Ray Charles
- "Whatcha See Is Whatcha Get" – The Dramatics
- "What's Going On" – Marvin Gaye
- "What Is Life" – George Harrison
- "When You're Hot, You're Hot" – Jerry Reed
- "(Where Do I Begin?) Love Story" – Andy Williams; also Henry Mancini
- "Wild Horses" – the Rolling Stones
- "Wild Night" – Van Morrison
- "Wild World" – Cat Stevens
- "The Witch Queen of New Orleans" – Redbone
- "Won't Get Fooled Again" – The Who
- "Yo-Yo" – The Osmonds
- "You Are Everything" – The Stylistics
- "Your Move" – Yes
- "Your Love (Means Everything to Me)" – Charles Wright & the Watts 103rd Street Rhythm Band
- "Your Song" – Elton John
- "You're All I Need to Get By" – Aretha Franklin
- "You've Got a Friend" – James Taylor
- "You've Got to Crawl (Before You Walk)" – 8th Day

== Notable singles ==
Song title	Artist(s)	Release date(s)	Highest Chart Position(s)	Other Chart Performance(s)
"All Day Music"	War	July 1971	35 (United States)	18 (U.S. Billboard Best Selling Soul Singles)
"Back Street Luv"	Curved Air	July 1971	4 (United Kingdom)	25 (Dutch Top 40) / 30 (Daverende 30)
Because I Love You	The Masters Apprentices	January 1971	12 (Australia)	n/a
"Black and Blue"	Chain	February 1971	6 (Australia)	n/a
"Black & White"	Greyhound	June 1971	6 (United Kingdom)	n/a
"Bridge over Troubled Water"	Aretha Franklin	April 1971	6 (United States)	n/a
"Bring the Boys Home"	Freda Payne	May 1971	12 (United States)	3 (US Best Selling Soul Singles (Billboard)
"Come Back Again"	Daddy Cool	September 1971	3 (Australia)	n/a
"Eagle Rock"	Daddy Cool	May 1971	1 (Australia)	17 (New Zealand)
"I'll Be Gone"	Spectrum	January 1971	1 (Australia)	n/a
"The Revolution Will Not Be Televised" b/w "Home Is Where the Hatred Is"	Gil Scott-Heron with Pretty Purdie and the Playboys	April 1971	n/a	n/a
"Under My Wheels"	Alice Cooper	September 1971	59 (United States)	66 (United Kingdom)
"Spoon" b/w "Shikaku Maru Ten"	Can	December 1971	n/a	n/a

== Published popular music ==
- "The Age of Not Believing" – w.m. Richard M. Sherman and Robert B. Sherman, from the film Bedknobs and Broomsticks
- "Always on My Mind" – w.m. Johnny Christopher, Mark James and Wayne Carson Thompson
- "American Pie" – w.m. Don McLean
- "And I Love You So" – w.m. Don McLean
- "And the Band Played Waltzing Matilda – w.m. Eric Bogle (written)
- "Baby I'm-a Want You" – w.m. David Gates
- "Been on a Train" – w.m. Laura Nyro
- "Ben" – w. Don Black m. Walter Scharf
- "The Candy Man" – w.m. Leslie Bricusse & Anthony Newley, from the film Willy Wonka & the Chocolate Factory
- "Day By Day" – w. John Michael Tebelak m. Stephen Schwartz
- "Eagle Rock" – w.m. Ross Wilson
- "How Can You Mend a Broken Heart" w.m. Barry Gibb and Robin Gibb
- "I Am Woman" – w. Helen Reddy m. Ray Burton
- "I Don't Know How to Love Him" w. Tim Rice m. Andrew Lloyd Webber. Introduced by Yvonne Elliman in the musical Jesus Christ Superstar
- "I'd Like to Teach the World to Sing" – w.m. B. Backer, B. Davis, R. Cook & R. Greenaway
- "I'm Still Here" – w.m. Stephen Sondheim
- "Imagine w.m. John Lennon
- "Kiss an Angel Good Morning" – w.m. Ben Peters
- "Knock Three Times" – w.m. Irwin Levine
- "The Last Farewell" – w.m. Roger Whittaker & Ron A. Webster
- "Losing My Mind" – w.m. Stephen Sondheim
- "Maggie May" w.m. Rod Stewart and Martin Quittenton
- "Pure Imagination" – w.m. Leslie Bricusse & Anthony Newley, from the film Willy Wonka & the Chocolate Factory
- "Riders on the Storm" – w.m. The Doors
- "Stairway to Heaven" – w. Robert Plant m. Jimmy Page
- "Substitutiary Locomotion" – w.m. Richard M. Sherman and Robert B. Sherman, from the film Bedknobs and Broomsticks
- "The Summer Knows" – w. Alan Bergman & Marilyn Bergman m. Michel Legrand from the film Summer of '42
- "Those Were the Days" w. Lee Adams, m. Charles Strouse, from the TV series All in the Family
- "Too Many Mornings" – w.m. Stephen Sondheim
- "Avec le Temps" – Dalida
- "Mamy Blue" – Dalida
- "Queen of the Hours" w.m. Jeff Lynne, Roy Wood

== Classical music ==
=== Premieres ===
Composer	Composition	Date	Location	Performers
Ligeti, György	Concert românesc	August 21, 1971	Fish Creek, US	Peninsula Music Festival Orchestra – Johnson
Stockhausen, Karlheinz	Sternklang	June 5, 1971	Tiergarten, Berlin, Germany	Collegium Vocale Köln, Gentle Fire, Smalley, Souster, Vetter – Stockhausen
Stockhausen, Karlheinz	Trans	October 16, 1971	Donaueschingen, Germany	SWF Sinfonie-Orchester – Bour

=== Compositions ===
- Malcolm Arnold – Viola Concerto with small orchestra
- Gavin Bryars – Jesus' Blood Never Failed Me Yet
- Elliott Carter – String Quartet No. 3
- George Crumb
  - Lux Aeterna for soprano, bass flute/soprano recorder, sitar, and percussion (two players)
  - Vox Balaenae (Voice of the Whale) for electric flute, electric cello, and amplified piano
- Mario Davidovsky – Chacona for violin, cello, and piano
- Morton Feldman – Rothko Chapel
- Lorenzo Ferrero – Primavera che non vi rincresca
- Jørgen Jersild – Three Danish Romances
- Mauricio Kagel – Staatstheater
- Ladislav Kupkovič – Klanginvasion auf Bonn
- Helmut Lachenmann – Gran Torso for string quartets
- Jean Langlais – Concerto for Organ no 3 "Reaction"
- Luigi Nono – Ein Gespenst geht um in der Welt
- Arvo Pärt – Symphony No. 3
- Steve Reich – Drumming
- Aulis Sallinen – Symphony No.1
- Dmitri Shostakovich – Symphony No. 15 in A major, Op. 141
- Karlheinz Stockhausen
  - Sternklang
  - Trans
- Iannis Xenakis
  - Antikhthon, ballet for orchestra
  - Aroura, for string ensemble of 12 players
  - Charisma, for clarinet and cello
  - Mikka, for violin
  - Persépolis, 8-track tape music

== Opera ==
- Alberto Ginastera – Beatrix Cenci, Opera Society of Washington in Washington, D.C., September 10
- Hans Werner Henze – Der langwierige Weg in die Wohnung der Natascha Ungeheuer, Deutsche Oper Berlin, September
- Lee Hoiby – Summer and Smoke
- Heitor Villa-Lobos – Yerma, Santa Fe Opera, Santa Fe, New Mexico, August 12

== Musical theater ==
- Ain't Supposed to Die a Natural Death – Off-Broadway production
- Follies (Stephen Sondheim) – Broadway production ran for 522 performances
- Godspell (Stephen Schwartz) – Broadway, London, and Off-Broadway productions; 572 performances on Broadway, 2,600 total NYC performances
- Jalta, Jalta (Alfi Kabiljo and Milan Grgić) – premièred in Zagreb
- Jesus Christ Superstar (Andrew Lloyd Webber and Tim Rice) – Broadway production opened at the Mark Hellinger Theatre and ran for 711 performances
- Lolita, My Love (John Barry and Alan Jay Lerner) – closed in pre-Broadway tryout
- Prettybelle – starring Angela Lansbury, closed in pre-Broadway tryout
- No, No, Nanette (Irving Caesar, Otto Harbach, Vincent Youmans) – Broadway revival
- On the Town – Broadway revival
- Show Boat (Jerome Kern and Oscar Hammerstein II) – London revival
- To Live Another Summer, To Pass Another Winter – Broadway production of Jewish revue; opened at the Helen Hayes Theatre on October 21 and transferred to the Lunt-Fontanne Theatre on January 10, 1972, for a total run of 173 performances.
- Two Gentlemen of Verona – Broadway production opened at the St. James Theatre and ran for 614 performances

== Musical films ==
- 200 Motels (American-British surrealist musical film)
- Aquellos años locos (Argentine musical film)
- Arriba Juventud (Argentine musical film)
- Bedknobs and Broomsticks Directed by Robert Stevenson and starring Angela Lansbury and David Tomlinson
- Bumbarash (Soviet musical film)
- Chervona Ruta (Soviet Ukrainian musical film)
- Fiddler on the Roof
- Haathi Mere Saathi (Hindi musical film)
- Journey Back to Oz (animated feature)
- Ma che musica maestro (Italian musical film)
- Out of the Darkness (Thai science fiction musical film)
- Raga, documentary about the life and work of Ravi Shankar
- Willy Wonka & the Chocolate Factory

== Births ==
- January 1 – Chris Potter, American saxophonist and composer
- January 2 – Taye Diggs, American actor and singer
- January 6
  - Irwin Thomas, American-Australian singer-songwriter and guitarist
  - Andrzej Piaseczny, Polish singer-songwriter, actor and television personality
- January 7 – Jeremy Renner, American actor and singer
- January 8 – Karen Poole English singer-songwriter (Alisha's Attic, Kylie Minogue, Sugababes)
- January 9
  - Angie Martinez, American rapper and radio talk host
  - MF Doom, British-American rapper and record producer (died 2020)
- January 11
  - Mary J. Blige, American singer-songwriter, rapper, record producer and actress
  - Tom Rowlands (The Chemical Brothers)
  - Stuart Davis, lyricist
- January 13 – Lee Agnew (Nazareth)
- January 17 –
  - Kid Rock, American singer
  - Lil Jon, American rapper, producer and actor
- January 18 – Jonathan Davis (KoЯn)
- January 19 – John Wozniak, American singer and songwriter (Marcy Playground)
- January 20
  - Gary Barlow, British singer-songwriter (Take That)
  - Questlove, American musician, composer, producer, photographer and author
- January 21 – Tweet, American singer
- January 22 – Geoffrey Gurrumul Yunupingu, indigenous Australian ethnic singer and musician (died 2017)
- January 25 – China Kantner (Daughter of Grace Slick and Paul Kantner)
- January 28 – Anthony Hamilton, American singer
- February 1 – Ron Welty (The Offspring)
- February 2
  - Michelle Gayle, British singer
  - Ben Mize (Counting Crows)
- February 3 – Christian Liljegren, Swedish singer-songwriter (Narnia, Audiovision and Divinefire)
- February 3 – Hyun Jin-young, South Korean singer, rapper and dancer
- February 5 – Sara Evans, American singer
- February 11 – Park So-hyun, South Korean actress
- February 13 – Sonia, English pop singer
- February 14 – Jeru the Damaja, American rapper and record producer
- February 15 – Daniel Powter, Canadian musician, singer and songwriter
- February 16
  - Amanda Holden, British actress and singer
  - Steven Houghton, British actor and singer
- February 17 – Jackie McKeown, Scottish guitarist and lead singer (The Yummy Fur)
- February 18 – Merritt Gant, American guitarist (Overkill)
- February 19 – Gil Shaham, violinist
- February 22
  - Lea Salonga, Filipina singer and Broadway Actress
  - Mark Bell, English disc jockey (LFO) (d. 2014)
- February 26
  - Erykah Badu, American singer-songwriter, record producer, disc jockey, activist and actress
  - Max Martin, Pop music writer and producer (NSYNC, Britney Spears, Taylor Swift, Katy Perry)
- February 27 – Rozonda "Chilli" Thomas, American singer (TLC)
- March 1
  - Alex Konrad, German DJ and producer (Baracuda)
  - Thomas Adès, English classical composer, pianist and conductor
- March 2 – Method Man, American rapper
- March 4 – Fergal Lawler Irish drummer (The Cranberries)
- March 6 – Betty Boo, English singer-songwriter and artist
- March 9 – C-Murder, American rapper
- March 11 – Erin O'Donnell, American Christian musician
- March 18 – Jeong Jun-ha, South Korean comedian and entertainer
- March 18 – Morgan Nicholls, English musician
- March 21 – John Hendy, British singer (East 17)
- March 23
  - Kim Min-jong, South Korean actor and singer
  - Abe Laboriel Jr., American drummer (Letters to Cleo)
- March 26
  - Francis Lawrence, American music video director, photographer, director and producer
  - Jay Sean, English singer, songwriter and record producer
  - Erick Morillo, American disc jockey (Reel 2 Real) (died 2020)
- March 29 – Attila Csihar, Hungarian vocalist (Mayhem)
- March 31 – Ewan McGregor, Scottish actor and singer
- April 2
  - Zeebra, Japanese rapper
  - Traci Braxton, American R&B singer and media personality (The Braxtons) (died 2022)
- April 3 – Wes Berggren, American musician
- April 4 – Josh Todd, American rock singer (Buckcherry)
- April 10 – Yoo Young-jin, South Korean singer-songwriter and producer
- April 11 – Oliver Riedel, German musician (Rammstein)
- April 15 – Kim Tae-woo, South Korean actor
- April 16 – Selena (Quintanilla), American Tejano singer (killed 1995)
- April 18 – Spliff Star, American rapper and record producer
- April 20
  - Mikey Welsh, American alternative rock bassist and painter (Weezer) (died 2011)
  - Tina Cousins, English singer and songwriter
- April 24
  - Mauro Pawlowski, Belgian guitar player and singer (Evil Superstars, Deus)
  - Alejandro Fernández, Mexican singer
- April 29
  - Siniša Vuco, Croatian musician
  - Tamara Johnson-George, American singer (SWV)
- May 3 – Damon Dash, record label executive
- May 6 – Chris Shiflett, American rock musician (Foo Fighters)
- May 9 – Paul McGuigan British bassist (Oasis)
- May 13 – O.C., American rapper
- May 16 – Rachel Goswell, English singer-songwriter and musician (Slowdive)
- May 16
  - Simon Katz, English musician (Jamiroquai)
  - Rick Trevino, American country singer and songwriter
- May 17 – Vernie Bennett, British singer (Eternal)
- May 18 – Annika Kjærgaard, Swedish singer (Alcazar)
- May 22
  - MC Eith, American rapper
  - Raimund Marasigan, drummer (Eraserheads)
- May 27 – Lisa "Left Eye" Lopes, American rapper and songwriter TLC (died 2002)
- May 30
  - Patrick Dahlheimer, Live
  - Idina Menzel, American actress and singer
  - Duncan Jones, English director, producer and screenwriter (son of David Bowie and Angie Bowie daughter of Lexi Jones)
- May 31
  - Adam Walton, British DJ
  - Uncle Sam, American R&B and pop singer
- June 1
  - Mario Cimarro, Cuban actor and singer
  - Monica Anghel, Romanian singer and television personality
- June 3 – Marie-Anett Mey, French model, entertainer, singer and musician (Fun Factory)
- June 4 – Tony McCarroll, English drummer (Oasis)
- June 5 – Mark Wahlberg, American rapper and actor
- June 7 – Toni Cottura, Italian-German producer and rapper (Fun Factory)
- June 9 – Erika Miklósa, Hungarian coloratura soprano
- June 10 – Joel Hailey, American R&B singer (K-Ci & JoJo)
- June 14 – Pritam, Indian singer, composer, instrumentalist
- June 14 – Billie Myers, British rock singer and songwriter
- June 15 – Bif Naked, singer
- June 16 – Tupac Shakur, American rapper, poet and actor (died 1996)
- June 17 – Paulina Rubio, Mexican singer
- June 18 – Nathan Morris American singer (Boyz II Men)
- June 20 – Jeordie White, American singer-songwriter and bass player (Marilyn Manson, Nine Inch Nails, A Perfect Circle, Goon Moon and The Desert Sessions)
- June 21 – Anette Olzon, Swedish singer-songwriter (Nightwish, Alyson Avenue)
- June 27 – Serginho, Brazilian footballer
- June 28 – Ray Slijngaard, Dutch singer and rapper (2 Unlimited)
- June 29
  - Matthew Good, Canadian musician
  - Wang Feng, Chinese singer
  - Nawal El Zoghbi, Lebanese singer and actress
- July 1
  - Jarobi White, American hip hop artist (A Tribe Called Quest)
  - Missy Elliott, American singer
  - Marlayne, Dutch singer
- July 4 – Andy Creeggan, Canadian guitarist and pianist (Barenaked Ladies and The Brothers Creeggan)
- July 11 – Leisha Hailey, American musician and actress
- July 12 – MC Breed, American rapper (died 2008)
- July 13
  - Jason Reece, American guitarist and drummer (...And You Will Know Us by the Trail of Dead and A Roman Scandal)
- July 14 – Nick McCabe, English musician
- July 15 – Mark Curry, American rapper
- July 16 – Ed Kowalczyk, Live
- July 17 – DJ Minutemix, P.M. Dawn
- July 20
  - Sandra Oh, Canadian actress
  - Jason Loewenstein, American guitarist (Sebadoh, The Fiery Furnaces)
  - DJ Screw, American rapper (died 2000)
- July 21 – Charlotte Gainsbourg, French actress and singer-songwriter
- July 23
  - Alison Krauss, American bluegrass-folk singer and musician
  - Scott Krippayne, American Christian musician
  - Dalvin DeGrate, American rapper (Jodeci)
- July 30 – Calogero, singer
- July 31 – John Lowery, American guitarist
- August 3 – Forbes Johnston, Scottish footballer (d. 2007)
- August 4 – Yo-Yo, rapper
- August 7 – Rachel York, American actress and singer
- August 12 – Phil Western, Canadian musician
- August 14 – Rhonda Ross Kendrick, American actress and singer (daughter of Diana Ross)
- August 17
  - Anthony Kearns, Irish tenor
  - Ed Motta, Brazilian soul and jazz musician
- August 18 – Aphex Twin, Irish-born British musician, composer and DJ
- August 20 – David Walliams, English actor
- August 21 – Liam Howlett, British musician (The Prodigy)
- August 23 – Bone Crusher, American rapper
- August 25 – Joby Talbot, English-born composer
- August 26 – Thalía, Mexican actress and singer
- August 27 – Julian Cheung, Hong Kong actor and singer
- August 28 – Neil Ekberg, drummer (Black Market Baby, Tesco Vee's Hate Police)
- August 30 – Lars Frederiksen (Rancid)
- September 1 – DJ Cocoa Chanelle, djer
- September 5 – Will Hunt, American drummer (Evanescence)
- September 6
  - Dolores O'Riordan, Irish rock vocalist (The Cranberries) (died 2018)
  - Leila K, Swedish singer and rapper
- September 8 – Vico C, American rapper and record producer
- September 11 – Richard Ashcroft, British singer and songwriter
- September 13 – Stella McCartney, English fashion designer daughter of Paul McCartney
- September 18 – Anna Netrebko, operatic soprano
- September 19 – D-Flame, hip-hop and reggae performer
- September 20 – Sin With Sebastian, German singer and songwriter
- September 21 – Alfonso Ribeiro, American actor, singer and dancer
- September 21 – Jimmy Constable, English pop singer (911)
- September 22 – Chesney Hawkes, English pop singer
- September 24 – Peter Salisbury, English drummer (The Verve)
- September 24 – Marty Cintron American singer (No Mercy)
- September 25 – Brian Dunkleman, American comedian, actor, and television personality
- September 27 – Cass Browne, English musician and writer (Senseless Things)
- September 28 – A. J. Croce, singer-songwriter and son of Jim Croce
- September 29 – Marcos Llunas, Spanish singer-songwriter
- October 2
  - Tiffany, American singer, songwriter, actress and teen icon
  - Jim Root, guitarist for Slipknot
  - LeShaun, American rapper
- October 3
  - Kevin Richardson American singer (Backstreet Boys)
  - Black Thought, American rapper, MC and record producer (The Roots)
- October 4
  - Brian Transeau, American disc jockey
  - Case Woodard, American R&B singer, songwriter and record producer
  - Friderika Bayer, Hungarian singer
- October 9 – Sian Evans, Welsh singer
- October 10 – Evgeny Kissin, Russian pianist
- October 11 – MC Lyte, American rapper
- October 16 – Rick Adams, English television presenter
- October 17
  - Chris Kirkpatrick, American singer NSYNC
  - Derrick Plourde (The Ataris) (died 2005)
- October 18 – Eva Santamaría, Spanish singer
- October 20
  - Dannii Minogue, Australian singer
  - Snoop Dogg, American rapper
- October 21
  - Jade Jagger, English jewellery designer and model daughter of Mick Jagger
  - Mathematics, American producer and DJ (Wu-Tang Clan)
- October 23 – Jinu, American rapper, singer, songwriter and entrepreneur (Jinusean)
- October 25
  - Athena Chu, Hong Kong actress and singer
  - Midori Gotō, Japanese violinist
- October 26 – Anthony Rapp, American singer and actor
- October 27
  - Oh Yeon-soo, South Korean actress
  - Elissa, Lebanese singer, actress, television personality and businesswoman
- October 30 – John Alford, British singer and actor
- November 5
  - Jonny Greenwood, British musician, songwriter and composer
  - Edmond Leung, Hong Kong singer-songwriter and producer
- November 6 – Joey Beltram, DJ and record producer
- November 8 – Tech N9ne, American rapper
- November 10 – Big Pun, American rapper and songwriter
- November 12 – Tom Shear, American musician and producer
- November 13 – Buddy Zabala, bassist (Eraserheads)
- November 16
  - Annely Peebo, operatic mezzo-soprano
  - Kim Se-hwang, South Korean guitarist (NEXT)
  - Justine Clarke, Australian actress, singer, author and television host.
- November 18
  - Özlem Tekin, Turkish singer
  - Crazy Toones, American record producer and disc jockey (d. 2017)
- November 19 – Tony Rich, American R&B singer-songwriter
- December 9 – Geoff Barrow, English music producer, composer and DJ (Portishead)
- December 15 – Clint Lowery, American musician, songwriter and producer (Dark New Day)
- December 16
  - Michael McCary, American singer (Boyz II Men)
  - Paul van Dyk, German DJ, record producer and musician
- December 20 – Roger J. Beaujard, American musician
- December 24 – Ricky Martin, Puerto Rican singer
- December 25
  - Dido, English singer
  - Noel Hogan Irish guitarist (The Cranberries)
  - Simone Angel, Dutch television host
- December 26 – Jared Leto, American musician and actor (Thirty Seconds To Mars)
- December 28 – Anita Doth, Dutch singer and songwriter (2 Unlimited)
- December 31 – Marcus Adoro, lead guitarist (Eraserheads)
- Date unknown – Simon O'Neill, New Zealand opera singer

== Deaths ==
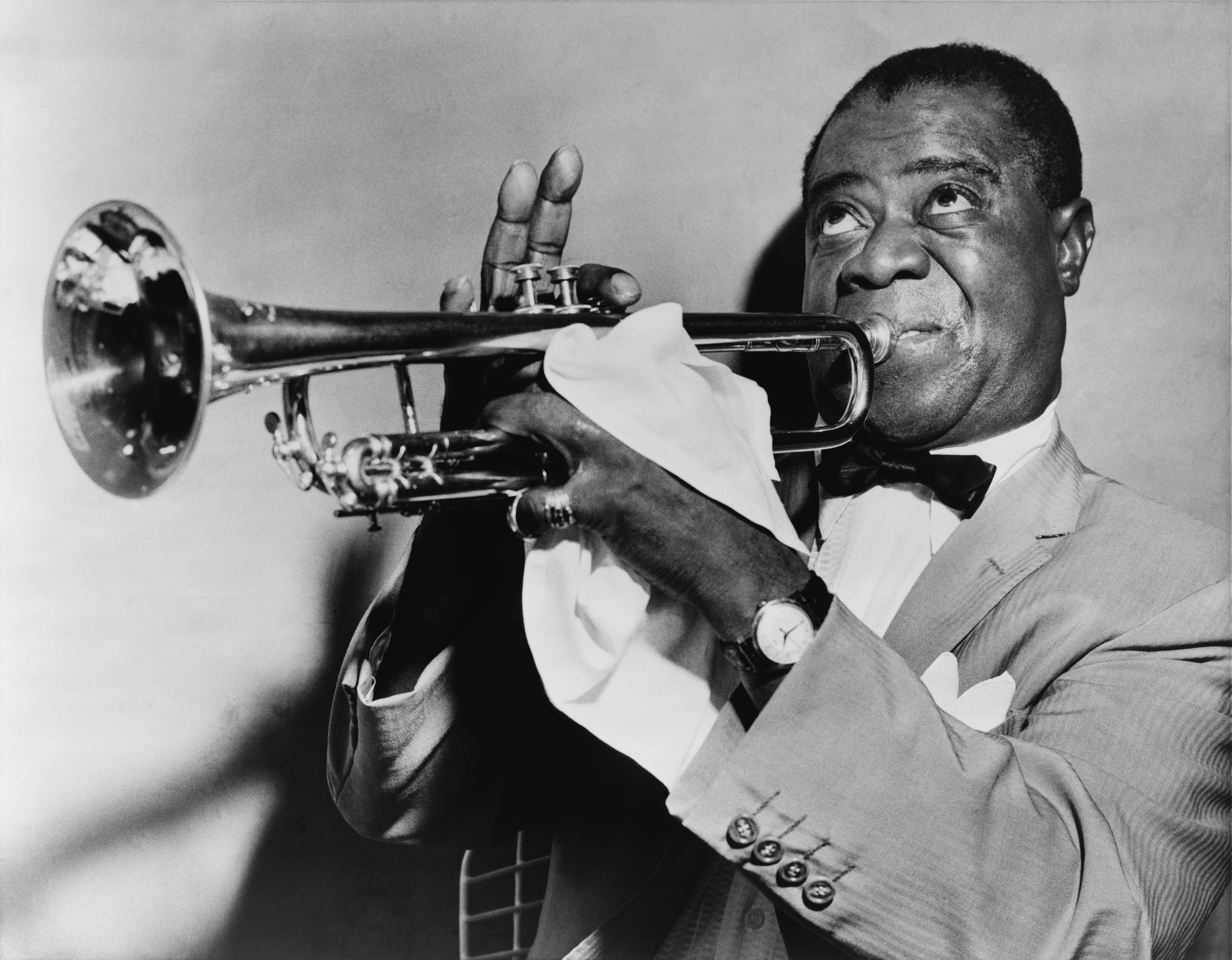
Louis Armstrong died on July 6

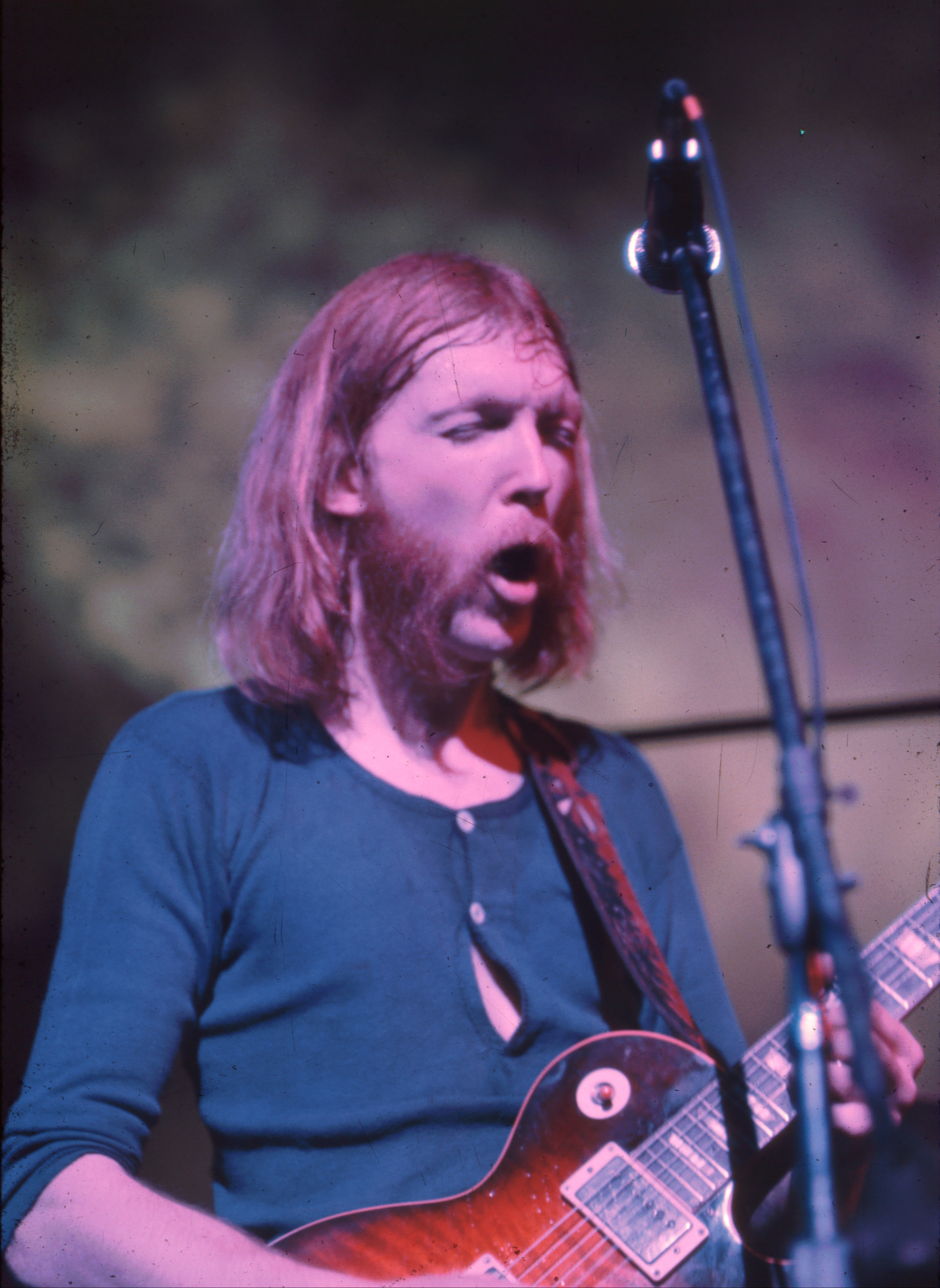
Guitarist Duane Allman died on October 29

- January 19 – Harry Shields, American musician (born 1899)
- January 24 – Therese Wiet, Austrian operetta singer (born 1885)
- February 1 – Harry Roy, British bandleader (born 1900)
- February 7 – Dock Boggs, banjo player (born 1898)
- March 6 – Thurston Dart, English harpsichordist and conductor (born 1921)
- March 17 – Piero Coppola, Italian conductor, pianist and composer, 82
- March 21 – Nan Wynn, US singer (born 1915)
- March 26 – Harold McNair, saxophonist and flute player (born 1931) (lung cancer)
- March 30 – Harold Craxton, pianist and composer, 85
- March 31 – Karl King, composer and bandleader (born 1891)
- April 6 – Igor Stravinsky, composer (born 1882)
- April 17 – Carmen Lombardo, US singer, composer and saxophonist, 67
- May 2 – Edith Day, US actress, singer and dancer (born 1896)
- May 30 – Marcel Dupré, organist and composer (born 1886)
- June 11 – Ambrose, English bandleader and violinist (born 1896)
- June 18 – Libby Holman, US singer and actress (born 1906)
- June 26 – Inia Te Wiata, New Zealand Māori bass-baritone opera singer, 56 (cancer)
- July 3 – Jim Morrison, lead singer of The Doors, 27 (heart failure, disputed)
- July 6 – Louis Armstrong, US jazz pioneer, 69 (heart attack)
- July 24 – Alan Rawsthorne, British composer, 66
- July 25 – Leroy Robertson, American composer, 74
- August 9 – Leslie Kong, Jamaican record producer (born 1933)
- August 13 – King Curtis, jazz and blues musician (born 1934) (murdered)
- August 15 – Edythe Baker, boogie-woogie pianist, 71
- August 17 – Tab Smith, saxophonist, 62
- August 25 – Ted Lewis, singer and bandleader, 81
- August 27 – Lil Hardin Armstrong, wife and musical collaborator of Louis Armstrong, 73
- September 13 – George Lambert, operatic baritone and voice teacher, 70
- October 2 – Bola de Nieve, Cuban singer, pianist, and songwriter, 60
- October 3 – Seán Ó Riada, composer and bandleader, 40 (cirrhosis of liver)
- October 12 – Gene Vincent, singer, 36 (stomach ulcer)
- October 13 – Benito Canónico, Venezuelan composer, 77
- October 24 – Carl Ruggles, composer, 95
- October 29 – Duane Allman of The Allman Brothers Band, 24 (motorcycle accident)
- November 4 – Ann Pennington, American actress & dancer, 77
- November 18 – Junior Parker, blues musician, 39 (brain tumour)
- November 22 – Zez Confrey, popular composer and pianist, 76
- December 8 – Marie Collier, operatic soprano, 44 (death from a fall)
- December 21 – Charlie Fuqua, vocalist (The Ink Spots)
- December 28 – Max Steiner, composer, 83
- date unknown – Marie-Anne Asselin, operatic mezzo-soprano and voice teacher

== Awards ==
=== Grammy Awards ===
- Grammy Awards of 1971

=== Country Music Association Awards ===
- Entertainer of the Year: Charley Pride
- Top Male Vocalist: Charley Pride
- Top Female Vocalist: Lynn Anderson
- Top Vocal Group: Osborne Brothers
- Top Instrumental Group: Danny Davis & the Nashville Brass
- Top Vocal Duo: Porter Wagoner and Dolly Parton
- Single of the Year: "Help Me Make It Through The Night" – Sammi Smith
- Song of the Year: "Easy Loving" – Freddie Hart
- Album of the Year: I Won't Mention It Again – Ray Price
- Musician of the Year: Jerry Reed

=== Eurovision Song Contest ===
- Eurovision Song Contest 1971
  - Séverine (of Monaco) for "Un banc, un arbre, une rue"
