= The Drum (song) =

Single by Bobby Sherman

from the album Portrait Of Bobby
- B-side: "Free Now to Roam"
- Released: April 1971
- Genre: Pop
- Length: 2:20
- Label: Metromedia
- Songwriter: Alan O'Day
- Producer: Ward Sylvester

Bobby Sherman singles chronology
"Cried Like a Baby" (1971)	"The Drum" (1971)	"Waiting at the Bus Stop" (1971)

"The Drum" is a song recorded by Bobby Sherman from his Portrait Of Bobby LP. It was released as a single in the spring of 1971, the second of two from the album. The song was written by Alan O'Day, his first of five Top 40 chart credits.

The song was Sherman's final top 40 hit in the U.S., peaking at No. 29 Billboard and No. 22 Cash Box, while reaching No. 2 on Billboard's Easy Listening chart.

In Canada, the song reached No. 7 on the "RPM 100" Top Singles chart and No. 3 Adult Contemporary.

== Chart performance ==
Chart (1971)	Peak position
Canada RPM Top Singles	7
Canada RPM Adult Contemporary	3
U.S. Billboard Hot 100	29
U.S. Billboard Easy Listening	2
U.S. Cash Box Top 100	22
