= In My Own Time =

In My Own Time may refer to:

- In My Own Time (album), a 1971 album by Karen Dalton
- "In My Own Time" (Electric Light Orchestra song)
- "In My Own Time" (Family song)
