= Bill Sheppard (music producer) =

American record producer (1922–1997)

William Edward "Bunky" Sheppard (March 20, 1922 – July 2, 1997) was an American music promoter and producer of the 1950s and 1960s. Chicago-based, he eventually became Vice President of 20th Century Fox Records (1978–1992).

== Life and career ==
William Edward Sheppard was born in New Orleans on March 20, 1922. He promoted such groups as The Esquires ("Get on Up", "And Get Away", and "Girls in the City"), The Sheppards and others. Sheppard died in Los Angeles on July 2, 1997, at the age of 55.

== Discography ==
- "Burnin'", The Bill Sheppard Combo on Ewart Abner's Abner Records
