= I've Found Someone of My Own (album) =

Studio album by The Free Movement
- Released: January 10, 1972
- Genre: R&B
- Length: 38:53
- Label: Columbia
- Producer: Michael Omartian, Bill Straw, Joe Porter, Toxey French

Singles from I've Found Someone of My Own
- 1. "I've Found Someone of My Own"/"I Can't Convince My Heart" Released: April 5, 1971; 2. "The Harder I Try (The Bluer I Get)"/"Comin' Home" Released: November 18, 1971; 3. "Love the One You're With"/"Could You Believe in a Dream" Released: March 3, 1972

Professional ratings
Review scores
Source	Rating
AllMusic	4/5 stars

I've Found Someone of My Own is the only studio album by The Free Movement. The album was released in January 10, 1972. It reached No. 26 on the US R&B album chart and No. 167 on the Billboard 200 chart.

The album featured three singles: "I've Found Someone of My Own", which reached No. 5 on the Billboard Hot 100, "The Harder I Try (The Bluer I Get)", which reached No. 6 on the US adult contemporary chart, and "Love the One You're With" which did not chart.

== Track listing ==
All songs written by Frank F. Robinson except where noted.

1. "I've Found Someone of My Own" – 3:44
2. "Land Where I Live" (H. Hilton/William Flemister) – 2:56
3. "Son of the Zulu King" (Chick Carlton) – 5:04
4. "If Only You Believe" (Brian Potter/Dennis Lambert) – 2:47
5. "Love the One You're With" (Stephen Stills) – 3:45
6. "The Harder I Try (The Bluer I Get)" – 3:26
7. "Comin' Home" – 2:58
8. "I Know I Could Love You Better (The Second Time Around)" (Bobby Arvon) – 3:21
9. "Your Love Has Grown Cold" (Michael Omartian) – 2:55
10. "Could You Believe in a Dream" (Al Jarreau) – 4:16
11. "Where Do We Go from Here" (Mike Settle) – 3:41

== Personnel ==
- Adrian Jefferson, Cheryl Conley, Claude Jefferson, Godoy Colbert, Jennifer Gates, & Josephine Brown – vocals
- Bill Straw – executive producer
- Michael Omartian – arranger, producer (tracks 1, 3–11), piano
- Toxey French – arranger, producer (tracks 1, 3–11)
- Joe Porter – producer (track 2)
- Jimmie Haskell – arranger
- Ben Benay & Jerry McGhee – guitars
- Jerry Scheff & Bobby West – bass
- Gene Pello – drums
- Milt Holland & Victor Feldman – percussion
- Bobbye Hall – congas
- King Erison – congas

== Charts ==
Chart (1972)	Peak position
US R&B	26
US Pop	167

Singles

Year	Single	Chart	Position
1971	"I've Found Someone of My Own"	US Pop	5
1971	"I've Found Someone of My Own"	US AC	7
1971	"I've Found Someone of My Own"	US R&B	20
1972	"The Harder I Try (The Bluer I Get)"	US Pop	50
1972	"The Harder I Try (The Bluer I Get)"	US AC	6
1972	"The Harder I Try (The Bluer I Get)"	US R&B	49
