= Your Love (Means Everything to Me) =

Single by Charles Wright & the Watts 103rd Street Rhythm Band

from the album You're So Beautiful
- B-side: "What Can You Bring Me"
- Released: April 1971
- Genre: R&B, Funk
- Length: 3:07
- Label: Warner Bros.
- Songwriter(s): Charles Wright
- Producer(s): Charles Wright

Charles Wright & the Watts 103rd Street Rhythm Band singles chronology
"Solution for Pollution" (1970)	"Your Love (Means Everything to Me)" (1971)	"Nobody Tellin' Me About My Baby" (1971)

"Your Love (Means Everything to Me)" is a song written by Charles Wright and performed by Charles Wright & the Watts 103rd Street Rhythm Band. It reached #9 on the R&B chart and #73 on the Billboard Hot 100 in 1971. The song was featured on their 1971 album, You're So Beautiful.

The song was produced by Wright and arranged by The Watts 103rd Street Band.

== In popular culture ==
- The band performed the song along with "Express Yourself" on season 1, episode 2 of the show Soul Train.
