= The Harder I Try (The Bluer I Get) =

Single by The Free Movement

from the album I've Found Someone of My Own
- B-side: "Comin' Home"
- Released: November 18, 1971
- Genre: R&B
- Length: 3:23
- Label: Columbia
- Songwriter(s): Frank F. Robinson
- Producer(s): Toxey French, Michael Omartian

The Free Movement singles chronology
"I've Found Someone of My Own" (1971)	"The Harder I Try (The Bluer I Get)" (1971)	"Love the One You're With" (1972)

"The Harder I Try (The Bluer I Get)" is a song written by Frank F. Robinson and performed by The Free Movement. It reached #6 on the US adult contemporary chart, #49 on the US R&B chart, and #50 on the Billboard Hot 100 in 1972. The song was featured on their 1972 album, I've Found Someone of My Own.

The song was produced by Toxey French and Michael Omartian and arranged by Jimmie Haskell, Omartian, and Bill Straw.
