= And Get Away =

Single by The Esquires

from the album Get on Up and Get Away
- B-side: "Everybody's Laughing"
- Released: November 1967
- Genre: R&B
- Length: 2:35
- Label: Bunky
- Songwriter(s): Gilbert Moorer, Bill Sheppard
- Producer(s): Bill Sheppard

The Esquires singles chronology
"Get on Up" (1967)	"And Get Away" (1967)	"You Say" (1968)

"And Get Away" is a song written by Gilbert Moorer and Bill Sheppard and performed by The Esquires. It reached #9 on the US R&B chart and #22 on the Billboard Hot 100 in 1967. The song was featured on their 1967 album, Get on Up and Get Away.

The song was produced by Bill Sheppard.
