= Get On Up (The Esquires song) =

"Get on Up"

Single by The Esquires

from the album Get on Up and Get Away
- B-side: "Listen to Me"
- Released: August 1967
- Genre: R&B
- Length: 2:25
- Label: Bunky
- Songwriters: Johnny Taylor, Gilbert Moorer, Bill Sheppard
- Producer: Bill Sheppard

The Esquires singles chronology
"Get on Up" (1967)	"And Get Away" (1967)

"Get on Up" is a song written by Johnny Taylor, Gilbert Moorer, and Bill Sheppard and performed by the Esquires. It was featured on their 1967 album, Get on Up and Get Away and was produced by Bill Sheppard.

== Chart performance ==
"Get on Up" reached No. 3 on the US R&B chart and No. 11 on the Billboard Hot 100 in 1967. The single ranked 34th on the Billboard Year-End Hot 100 singles of 1967. The group released an updated version in 1976 entitled "Get on Up '76" which reached No. 62 on the US R&B chart.

== Sampling ==
- "Get on Up" was sampled in the Carmen Electra song "Everybody Get on Up" from her 1993 album, Carmen Electra. The song reached No. 33 on the US Dance chart.
