= Talk It Over in the Morning (song) =

Single by Anne Murray

from the album Talk It Over in the Morning
- B-side: "Head Above the Water"
- Released: August 1971
- Genre: Country pop
- Length: 2:28
- Label: Capitol
- Songwriters: Roger Nichols; Paul Williams

Anne Murray singles chronology
"It Takes Time" (1971)	"Talk It Over in the Morning" (1971)	"I Say a Little Prayer/By the Time I Get to Phoenix" (1971)

"Talk It Over in the Morning" is a single by Canadian country pop artist Anne Murray. Released in August 1971, it was the first single from her album Talk It Over in the Morning. It peaked at number 1 on the RPM Country Tracks chart.

== Chart performance ==
Chart (1971)	Peak position
Canadian RPM Country Tracks	1
Canadian RPM Top Singles	12
Canadian RPM Adult Contemporary	1
U.S. Billboard Hot 100	57
U.S. Billboard Easy Listening	7
