= A Stranger in My Place =

Single by Anne Murray

from the album Straight, Clean and Simple
- B-side: "Sycamore Slick"
- Released: February 1971
- Genre: Country pop
- Length: 2:54
- Label: Capitol
- Songwriters: Kenny Rogers; Kin Vassy

Anne Murray singles chronology
"Sing High, Sing Low" (1971)	"A Stranger in My Place" (1971)	"It Takes Time" (1971)

"A Stranger in My Place" is a song by Kenny Rogers and Kin Vassy (a member of The First Edition), first recorded on Kenny Rogers & The First Edition's 1970 album Something's Burning. The most successful charting single of the song was by Canadian country pop artist Anne Murray. Released in February 1971, it was the second single from her album Straight, Clean and Simple. It peaked at number 1 on the Canadian RPM Country Tracks chart. It also reached number 27 on the Billboard Hot Country Singles chart in the United States.

In the course of 1971, the song was also covered by Bill Anderson (on his album Always Remember) and Del Reeves (on his album The Del Reeves Album). In 1972 it was covered by Joan Baez on her Come from the Shadows album.

In 1980, the song charted again for Jimmy "Orion" Ellis, reaching #69 on the country charts.

== Chart performance (Anne Murray version) ==
Chart (1971)	Peak position
Canadian RPM Country Tracks	1
Canadian RPM Top Singles	18
Canadian RPM Adult Contemporary	1
US Hot Country Songs (Billboard)	27
US Bubbling Under Hot 100 (Billboard)	22
