= The Free Movement =

American R&B vocal group

The Free Movement was an American R&B vocal group formed in 1970 in Los Angeles, California, United States.

== History ==
The band issued a hit single, "I've Found Someone of My Own", on Decca Records in 1971 which climbed to No. 5 in its 24th week on the Billboard Hot 100. The following year, the group signed to Columbia to release an album. They managed to chart a second single, but the group had no further success, despite reaching No. 7 on the Easy Listening Chart. The Columbia LP contained both single releases.

== Members ==
- Godoy Colbert (formerly of Pilgrim Travelers and The Pharaohs)
- Josephine Brown (formerly of Five Bells of Joy)
- Cheryl Conley
- Jennifer Gates
- Adrian Jefferson
- Claude Jefferson

== Discography ==
=== Studio albums ===
Year	Album	US Pop	US R&B	Record label
1972	I've Found Someone of My Own	167	26	Columbia Records

=== Compilation albums ===
Year	Album	US Pop	US R&B	Record label
1996	The Free Movement: Golden Classics	—	—	Collectables Records

=== Singles ===
Year	Title	Peak chart positions				Record Label	B-side	Album
Year	Title	US Pop	US AC	US R&B	AUS	Record Label	B-side	Album
1971	"I've Found Someone of My Own"	5	7	20	41	Decca Records	"I Can't Convince My Heart"	I've Found Someone of My Own
1971	"The Harder I Try (The Bluer I Get)"	50	6	49	—	Columbia Records	"Comin' Home"	I've Found Someone of My Own
1972	"Love the One You're With"	—	—	—	—	Columbia Records	"Could You Believe in a Dream"	I've Found Someone of My Own
1973	"I Can't Move No Mountains"	—	—	—	—	Columbia Records	"Every Step of the Way"	
