= Straight, Clean and Simple =

Studio album by Anne Murray
- Released: February 26, 1971
- Studio: Eastern Sound and Bay Studios (Toronto, Ontario, Canada); Vanguard Studios (New York City, New York, USA)
- Genre: Country
- Length: 26:43
- Label: Capitol
- Producer: Brian Ahern

Anne Murray chronology
Snowbird (1970)	Straight, Clean and Simple (1971)	Talk It Over in the Morning (1971)

Singles from Straight, Clean and Simple
- 1. "Sing High, Sing Low" Released: December 1970; 2. "It Takes Time" Released: April 1971

Straight, Clean and Simple is the fourth studio album by Anne Murray issued in 1971 on Capitol Records. Outside Canada, where Anne Murray was not so well known, it was simply titled Anne Murray. The album contained material by Burt Bacharach, Hal David, Kenny Rogers and Kin Vassy. The album peaked at No. 4 on the RPM album chart in Canada on 27 March 1971 and at No. 121 on the Billboard Top LP's chart.

== Track listing ==
1. "It Takes Time" (Shirley Eikhard) - 3:18
2. "People's Park" (Brent Titcomb) - 2:55
3. "One Day I Walk" (Bruce Cockburn) - 2:27
4. "Child of Mine" (Carole King, Gerry Goffin) - 3:00
5. "Sycamore Slick" (Titcomb, Vicky Taylor) - 1:55
6. "Wishing Smiles Made It All True" (Richard Gael) - 2:13
7. "Sing High, Sing Low" (Titcomb) - 2:47
8. "Days of the Looking Glass" (Gene MacLellan) - 2:21
9. "A Stranger in My Place" (Kenny Rogers, Kin Vassy) - 2:54
10. "I'll Never Fall In Love Again" (Burt Bacharach, Hal David) - 2:53

== Personnel ==
- Anne Murray – vocals
- Bill Speer – musician
- Brian Ahern – musician, arrangements
- Bobby Edwards – musician
- Amos Garrett – musician
- Buddy Cage – musician
- Skip Beckwith – musician
- Terry Clarke – musician
- Ron Rully – musician
- Tommy Graham – musician
- Brent Titcomb – musician
- Bill Richards – musician
- Dr. Music – musicians
- Rick Wilkins – string arrangements

=== Production ===
- Paul White – executive producer
- Brian Ahern – producer, engineer
- Skip Beckwith – engineer
- Frank Bertin – engineer
- Bill Ronckin – engineer
- Chris Skene – engineer
- Miles Wilkinson – engineer
