= Sing High, Sing Low =

Single by Anne Murray

from the album Straight, Clean and Simple
- B-side: "Days of the Looking Glass"
- Released: December 1970
- Recorded: 1970
- Genre: Country pop
- Label: Capitol
- Songwriter: Brent Titcomb

Anne Murray singles chronology
"Put Your Hand in the Hand" (1970)	"Sing High, Sing Low" (1970)	"A Stranger in My Place" (1971)

"Sing High, Sing Low" is a single by Canadian country pop artist Anne Murray. It was the first single from her album Straight, Clean and Simple. In early 1971, it peaked at number 1 on the RPM Country Tracks chart as well as the Canadian Adult Contemporary chart.

The song was a minor hit in the U.S., reaching number 53 on the Billboard Hot Country Singles chart and number 21 AC.

== Chart performance ==
Chart (1971)	Peak position
Canadian RPM Country Tracks	1
Canadian RPM Top Singles	4
Canadian RPM Adult Contemporary	1
New Zealand (Listener)	20
U.S. Billboard Hot Country Singles	53
U.S. Billboard Hot 100	83
U.S. Billboard Easy Listening	21
