= Girls in the City =

Single by The Esquires
- B-side: "Ain't Gonna Give It Up"
- Released: January 1971
- Genre: R&B
- Length: 2:45
- Label: Lamarr
- Songwriter(s): Tony Hester
- Producer(s): Bill Sheppard, Walter Gardner

The Esquires singles chronology
"Dancin' a Hole in the World" (1971)	"Girls in the City" (1971)	"Let Me Build You a New World" (1974)

"Girls in the City" is a song written by Tony Hester and performed by The Esquires. It reached No. 18 on the US R&B chart and No. 120 on the Billboard pop chart in 1971.

The song was produced by Bill Sheppard and Walter Gardner and arranged by Mike Terry.
