= I've Found Someone of My Own =

Single by The Free Movement

from the album I've Found Someone of My Own
- B-side: "I Can't Convince My Heart"
- Released: 5 April 1971
- Genre: R&B
- Length: 3:45
- Label: Decca
- Songwriter: Frank F. Robinson
- Producer: Joe Porter

The Free Movement singles chronology
"I've Found Someone of My Own" (1971)	"The Harder I Try (The Bluer I Get)" (1971)

"I've Found Someone of My Own" is a song written by Frank F. Robinson and performed by The Free Movement. It was produced by Joe Porter, arranged by Jimmie Haskell and Michael Omartian, and was released in April 1971 from the band's 1972 album, I've Found Someone of My Own.

It reached #5 on the Billboard Hot 100, #7 on the US adult contemporary chart, and #20 on the US R&B chart in 1971.

The single ranked #27 on the Billboard Year-End Hot 100 singles of 1971.

== Chart history ==
=== Weekly charts ===
Chart (1971)	Peak position
Australian Kent Music Report	41
Canada RPM Top Singles	22
U.S. Billboard Hot 100	5
U.S. Billboard Adult Contemporary	7
U.S. Billboard R&B	20
U.S. Cash Box Top 100	6

=== Year-end charts ===
Chart (1971)	Rank
U.S. Billboard Hot 100	27

== Other charting versions ==
- Cal Smith, as a single in 1972, which reached #4 on the US country chart and #13 on the Canadian country chart.

== Other versions ==
- Ray Conniff and The Singers, on their 1971 album, I'd Like to Teach the World to Sing.
- Frankie Ford, as the B-side to his 1976 single "Battle Hymn of the Republic". It was featured on his 1976 album, Frankie Ford.
- Mel Street, on his 1972 album, Borrowed Angel.
