= CBC band =

CBC Band
- Origin: South Vietnam, Vietnam
- Genres: Roots rock, americana, swamp rock
- Years active: 1964–1976; 1983–1999; 2011-present
- Past members: Bich Loan; Nam Loc; Tung Linh; Tung Van

CBC Band was formed in 1963 by three siblings in Saigon, Vietnam. The CBC Band name was an acronym given to the band by their mother and stood for Con Ba Cu which translates to “Mother’s Children.” By 1969, with the addition of a few members, siblings Tung Linh, Bich Loan, and Tung Van began to perform for the U.S. Military Bases stationed in Vietnam. In 1973, with their growing popularity, the band toured all through Southeast Asia including Thailand, Malaysia, Indonesia, India, and Singapore. With the fall of Saigon, the band became refugees in New Delhi, India and were taken in by the Tibetan Buddhist Temple located there. From this location they lived and recorded music until moving to Paris, France. Eventually, their friend, Mr. Frank Ford, sponsored them in 1975 to move to the United States. They toured all over the U.S. performing in concert venues and hotels with Houston, Texas becoming their home base. In 1990 they opened a mini club where they performed regularly for almost 20 years. In recent years, the band has reunited and have started to travel and perform again.

CBC Band was a Vietnamese band popular in South Vietnam during the Vietnam War. Made up of a family of poor Vietnamese, the CBC discovered they could earn money by playing Western rock music for American soldiers in Saigon.

Fronted by Nam Loc and her brother, Tung Linh, a renowned guitar player in Vietnam at the time, the group played regularly at the My Phung bar in Saigon. On May 29, 1971, they played at South Vietnam's first International rock festival, Live at the Saigon Zoo.

On April 8, 1971, a bomb exploded in the bar killing one GI and a 14-year-old girl. While on tour in India, in early 1974, they applied for asylum in Australia. After being denied, they were taken in by Tibetan monks who were themselves refugees in India. When the South fell in 1975, they applied at the US Embassy to grant them entry as refugees. They eventually settled in Houston, Texas.

On April 8, 2011, the CBC band held a reunion for war veterans in Houston, Texas .

== Bibliography ==
Notes

4. Rolling Stone Magazine Number 71. Tom Marlow. November 26 1970

References

- BBC World Service (Nov 17, 2012). "Episode 1 Vietnam's Rock 'n' Roll War". BBC World Service.
- Hibbard, Ned (2012). "CBC Band & Vietnam Vets Reunion". Fox 26 News.
- Mariano, Frank (1974). "CBC Band: A Band on the Run".
