= Cried Like a Baby =

Single by Bobby Sherman

from the album Portrait Of Bobby
- B-side: "Is Anybody There"
- Released: 1971
- Genre: Pop
- Length: 3:20
- Label: Metromedia
- Songwriters: Craig Doerge & Paul Williams
- Producer: Ward Sylvester

Bobby Sherman singles chronology
| "Goin' Home (Sing A Song Of Christmas Cheer)" (1970) | "Cried Like a Baby" (1971) | "The Drum" (1971) |

"Cried Like a Baby" is a song released by Bobby Sherman in 1971. The song spent nine weeks on the Billboard Hot 100 chart, peaking at No. 16, while reaching No. 9 on Billboard's Easy Listening chart, No. 10 on the Cash Box Top 100, and No. 10 on Canada's "RPM 100".

== Chart performance ==
| Chart (1971) | Peak position |
|---|---|
| US Billboard Hot 100 | 16 |
| US Billboard Easy Listening | 9 |
| US Cash Box Top 100 | 10 |
| Canada - RPM 100 | 10 |
