= It Takes Time (Anne Murray song) =

Single by Anne Murray

from the album Straight, Clean and Simple
- A-side: "Put Your Hand in the Hand"
- Released: April 1971
- Recorded: 1970
- Genre: Country
- Length: 3:15
- Label: Capitol Records 3082
- Songwriter(s): Shirley Eikhard
- Producer(s): Brian Ahern

Anne Murray singles chronology
"A Stranger in My Place" (1971)	"It Takes Time" (1971)	"Talk It Over in the Morning" (1971)

"It Takes Time" is a song written by Shirley Eikhard and originally performed by Anne Murray. Eikhard was 15 years old at the time of Murray's recording; it was her first professionally recorded composition.

Murray's version of the song reached No. 1 on the Canadian Adult Contemporary chart, #6 on the Canadian Country chart, and #26 on the Canadian Pop chart in 1971. The song also appeared on her 1971 album, Straight, Clean and Simple. The song was produced by Brian Ahern.

At the age of 16, Eikhard released her version of the song. Issued as a single, the track reached No. 7 on the Canadian Adult Contemporary chart and #33 on the Canadian Country chart. It was released on her 1972 album, Shirley Eikhard.

== Chart performance ==
=== Anne Murray ===
Chart (1971)	Peak position
Canadian RPM Country Tracks	6
Canadian RPM Top Singles	26
Canadian RPM Adult Contemporary	1

=== Shirley Eikhard ===
Chart (1971)	Peak position
Canadian RPM Country Tracks	33
Canadian RPM Adult Contemporary	7

== Other cover versions ==
- Later in 1971, Kim Carnes recorded a version of the song. It appeared on her debut album, Rest on Me, produced by Jimmy Bowen.
