= In My Own Time (Family song) =

Single by Family
- B-side: "Seasons"
- Released: 1971
- Genre: Art rock
- Length: 3:35
- Label: Reprise K 14090
- Songwriters: Chapman, Whitney
- Producer: Family

Family singles chronology
"Today" (1970)	"In My Own Time" (1971)	"Larf and Sing" (1971)

"In My Own Time" is a song and single written by Roger Chapman and John Whitney and performed by British group, Family.

It was first released in 1971. It entered the UK singles chart in July reaching number 4 and stayed for thirteen weeks on the chart. The song peaked at number 86 in Australia.

Music historian Bob Stanley has commented on its unlikely British chart success: "it has a startlingly off the wall, music concrete intro, an eccentric burst of atonal noise to match the start of Adam & the Ants' Prince Charming."
