= The Esquires =

American R&B music group

The Esquires were an American R&B group from Milwaukee, Wisconsin, United States, principally active from 1957 to 1976.

== History ==
The group first formed in 1957 around the Moorer family: Gilbert (born Gilbert Moorer, Jr., August 20, 1941, Birmingham, Alabama, died August 28, 2008), his brother Alvis (born Alvis V. Moorer, January 18, 1940, Birmingham, Alabama, died August 21, 2011), and their sister Betty. They first performed as Betty Moorer and the Esquires. When their sister and lead singer left, the group shortened its name to The Esquires, and Gilbert became lead singer. In 1961, Sam Pace (born Sammie L. Pace, September 22, 1944, Kansas City, Missouri, died January 7, 2013) joined as a tenor. Millard Edwards, a bass, also sang during this period as did Shawn Taylor. They went through many lineup changes over their first decade, which saw them aiming mostly for local recognition. In 1966, they moved to Chicago, Illinois, and auditioned for Curtis Mayfield, who was not interested in signing them. They then attempted to sign with Constellation Records, but the record label went under at the end of 1966; they signed instead with Bunky Records, Constellation's successor. Bunky was distributed by Scepter Records on the national level.

Their debut record for Bunky/Scepter was "Get on Up" (1967), becoming a major hit in the United States, peaking at No. 11 as a pop single and reaching No. 3 on the US Billboard R&B chart. Following the release they played Chicago's Regal Theater and the Apollo Theatre in New York City. Further singles were also successes, and the group released one full-length LP. After five singles on Bunky the group signed a deal with Scepter themselves late in 1968. They later returned to Bunky and then, in 1970, signed with Capitol Records for one single ("Reach Out") and Lamarr Records in 1971 for "Girls in the City".

Perry Moorer played alto saxophone with the group. He died in 1996.

Gilbert Moorer died from throat cancer on August 28, 2008, at the age of 67.

Alvis Moorer died on August 21, 2011, at the age of 71.

Sam Pace died after a long illness on January 7, 2013, at the age of 68.

Edwards, who lives in Chicago, is now the only surviving member of the band from its recording days.

== Members ==
- Gilbert Moorer
- Alvis Moorer
- Betty Moorer
- Sam Pace (1961–)
- Shawn Taylor (1965–1967)
- Millard Edwards
- Perry Moorer (alto saxophone)
- Goose "Preacher" Hilliard Smith

== Discography ==
=== Albums ===
Year	Album	Record label
1967	Get on Up and Get Away	Bunky Records
1982	The Esquires	Flying Heart Records
1984	Whatcha Got?	Flying Heart Records
1987	The Esquires	Flying Heart Records

=== Singles ===
Year	Title	Peak chart positions		Record Label	B-side	Album
Year	Title	US	US R&B	Record Label	B-side	Album
1967	"Get on Up"	11	3	Bunky Records	"Listen to Me"	Get on Up and Get Away
1967	"And Get Away"	22	9	Bunky Records	"Everybody's Laughing"	Get on Up and Get Away
1968	"You Say"	126	41	Bunky Records	"State Fair"	
1968	"Why Can't I Stop"	—	48	Bunky Records	"The Feeling's Gone"	
1968	"I Know I Can"	—	—	Bunky Records	"How Could It Be"	
1968	"You've Got the Power"	91	29	Wand Records	"No Doubt About It"	
1969	"I Don't Know"	—	37	Wand Records	"Part Angel"	
1969	"Reach Out"	—	—	Capitol Records	"Listen to Me"	
1970	"Ain't No Reason"	—	—	B and G Records	"Baba-Daba-Dop"	
1971	"Dancin' a Hole in the World"	—	—	Rocky Ridge; Records	"That Ain't No Reason"	
1971	"Girls in the City"	120	18	Lamarr Records	"Ain't Gonna Give It Up"	
1974	"Let Me Build You a New World"	—	—	New World; Records	"Stay"	
1976	"Get on Up '76"	—	62	Ju-Par Records	"The Feeling's Gone"	
1980	"The Show Ain't Over"	—	—	Cigar Man; Music Records	"What Good Is Music?"	
