= Ward Sylvester =

American entertainment industry executive

Ward Sylvester (October 22, 1939 – June 12, 2017) was an American entertainment industry producer, manager, promoter, executive and consultant. He served as President of Pacific Arts Inc., and Personality Productions; Vice President of Columbia Pictures TV and Metro-Goldwyn-Mayer. He was partners with Rick Marcelli and the Marcelli-Heller Company. Sylvester served as a consultant for Group W, MCA and Merv Griffin.

His television productions include The Day the Earth Moved, People Magazine on TV and Crimewatch Tonight. Sylvester is mostly known for managing the careers of The Monkees and Bobby Sherman.
