= List of Billboard Hot 100 top-ten singles in 1971 =

This is a list of singles that have peaked in the Top 10 of the Billboard Hot 100 during 1971.

The Carpenters, Three Dog Night, Donny Osmond, Marvin Gaye, Aretha Franklin, and The Partridge Family each had three top-ten hits in 1971, tying them for the most top-ten hits during the year.

== Top-ten singles ==
- (#) – 1971 Year-end top 10 single position and rank

Top ten entry date	Single	Artist(s)	Peak	Peak date	Weeks in top ten
Singles from 1970
December 12	"Black Magic Woman"	Santana	4	January 9	7
December 12	"Does Anybody Really Know What Time It Is?"	Chicago	7	January 2	5
December 19	"Knock Three Times" (#10)	Dawn	1	January 23	11
Singles from 1971
January 2	"Domino"	Van Morrison	9	January 2	1
January 9	"Lonely Days"	Bee Gees	3	January 30	7
January 9	"Stoney End"	Barbra Streisand	6	January 23	4
January 16	"Groove Me"	King Floyd	6	January 30	6
January 23	"Rose Garden"	Lynn Anderson	3	February 13	6
January 23	"Your Song"	Elton John	8	January 23	4
January 23	"It's Impossible"	Perry Como	10	January 23	1
January 30	"One Bad Apple" (#4)	The Osmonds	1	February 13	9
January 30	"I Hear You Knocking"	Dave Edmunds	4	February 13	5
February 6	"If I Were Your Woman"	Gladys Knight & the Pips	9	February 13	2
February 13	"Mama's Pearl"	The Jackson 5	2	February 27	5
February 20	"If You Could Read My Mind"	Gordon Lightfoot	5	February 20	5
February 20	"Sweet Mary"	Wadsworth Mansion	7	February 27	3
February 20	"Mr. Bojangles"	Nitty Gritty Dirt Band	9	February 20	3
February 27	"Me and Bobby McGee"	Janis Joplin	1	March 20	8
February 27	"Amos Moses"	Jerry Reed	8	February 27	2
March 6	"Just My Imagination (Running Away with Me)" (#9)	The Temptations	1	April 3	9
March 6	"She's a Lady"	Tom Jones	2	March 20	8
March 6	"For All We Know"	The Carpenters	3	March 13	7
March 13	"Proud Mary"	Ike & Tina Turner	4	March 27	5
March 13	"Doesn't Somebody Want to Be Wanted"	The Partridge Family	6	March 27	6
March 13	"Have You Ever Seen the Rain?" / "Hey Tonight"	Creedence Clearwater Revival	8	March 13	1
March 20	"What's Going On"	Marvin Gaye	2	April 10	8
March 20	"Help Me Make It Through the Night"	Sammi Smith	8	March 27	3
March 27	"What Is Life"	George Harrison	10	March 27	1
April 3	"Another Day" / "Oh Woman, Oh Why"	Paul McCartney	5	April 17	5
April 3	"(Where Do I Begin?) Love Story"	Andy Williams	9	April 3	1
April 10	"Joy to the World" (#1)	Three Dog Night	1	April 17	11
April 10	"One Toke Over the Line"	Brewer & Shipley	10	April 10	2
April 17	"Put Your Hand in the Hand"	Ocean	2	May 1	7
April 24	"Never Can Say Goodbye"	The Jackson 5	2	May 8	7
April 24	"I Am... I Said"	Neil Diamond	4	May 8	4
April 24	"If"	Bread	4	May 15	5
April 24	"Stay Awhile"	The Bells	7	May 1	4
May 1	"Chick-A-Boom (Don't Ya Jes' Love It)"	Daddy Dewdrop	9	May 8	5
May 8	"Me and You and a Dog Named Boo"	Lobo	5	May 15	5
May 8	"Bridge over Troubled Water" / "A Brand New Me"	Aretha Franklin	6	June 5	6
May 15	"Brown Sugar"	The Rolling Stones	1	May 29	8
May 22	"Want Ads"	Honey Cone	1	June 12	8
May 22	"It Don't Come Easy"	Ringo Starr	4	June 5	7
May 29	"Sweet and Innocent"	Donny Osmond	7	June 5	5
June 5	"It's Too Late" / "I Feel the Earth Move" (#3)	Carole King	1	June 19	10
June 5	"Rainy Days and Mondays"	The Carpenters	2	June 19	7
June 12	"Treat Her Like a Lady"	Cornelius Brothers & Sister Rose	3	July 3	7
June 12	"I'll Meet You Halfway"	The Partridge Family	9	June 12	2
June 19	"Indian Reservation (The Lament of the Cherokee Reservation Indian)" (#6)	The Raiders	1	July 24	9
June 26	"Don't Pull Your Love"	Hamilton, Joe Frank & Reynolds	4	July 17	6
June 26	"When You're Hot, You're Hot"	Jerry Reed	9	June 26	3
July 3	"You've Got a Friend"	James Taylor	1	July 31	8
July 10	"Mr. Big Stuff"	Jean Knight	2	August 14	8
July 10	"That's the Way I've Always Heard It Should Be"	Carly Simon	10	July 10	2
July 17	"How Can You Mend a Broken Heart" (#5)	Bee Gees	1	August 7	10
July 17	"Draggin' the Line"	Tommy James	4	August 14	6
July 24	"Take Me Home, Country Roads" (#8)	John Denver with Fat City	2	August 28	8
July 24	"Sooner or Later"	The Grass Roots	9	July 31	2
July 31	"What the World Needs Now Is Love/Abraham, Martin and John"	Tom Clay	8	August 14	3
August 7	"Mercy Mercy Me (The Ecology)"	Marvin Gaye	4	August 21	4
August 7	"Beginnings" / "Colour My World"	Chicago	7	August 14	3
August 14	"Signs"	Five Man Electrical Band	3	August 28	5
August 21	"Sweet Hitch-Hiker"	Creedence Clearwater Revival	6	August 21	2
August 21	"Liar"	Three Dog Night	7	August 28	3
August 28	"Go Away Little Girl" (#7)	Donny Osmond	1	September 11	9
August 28	"Spanish Harlem"	Aretha Franklin	2	September 11	6
August 28	"Smiling Faces Sometimes"	The Undisputed Truth	3	September 4	6
September 4	"Uncle Albert/Admiral Halsey"	Paul and Linda McCartney	1	September 4	7
September 4	"Ain't No Sunshine"	Bill Withers	3	September 18	6
September 4	"I Just Want to Celebrate"	Rare Earth	7	September 11	4
September 11	"Maggie May" / "Reason to Believe" (#2)	Rod Stewart	1	October 2	11
September 18	"The Night They Drove Old Dixie Down"	Joan Baez	3	October 2	8
September 18	"Whatcha See Is Whatcha Get"	The Dramatics	9	September 25	2
September 25	"Superstar"	The Carpenters	2	October 16	8
October 2	"Yo-Yo"	The Osmonds	3	October 16	8
October 2	"Do You Know What I Mean"	Lee Michaels	6	October 9	5
October 9	"If You Really Love Me"	Stevie Wonder	8	October 16	3
October 9	"Sweet City Woman"	The Stampeders	8	October 23	3
October 16	"Gypsys, Tramps & Thieves"	Cher	1	November 6	9
October 23	"Theme from Shaft"	Isaac Hayes	1	November 20	9
October 30	"Imagine"	John Lennon	3	November 13	6
October 30	"Peace Train"	Cat Stevens	7	November 6	5
October 30	"I've Found Someone of My Own"	The Free Movement	5	November 13	3
November 6	"Inner City Blues (Make Me Wanna Holler)"	Marvin Gaye	9	November 6	2
November 13	"Have You Seen Her"	The Chi-Lites	3	December 11	8
November 20	"Family Affair"	Sly and the Family Stone	1	December 4	9
November 20	"Baby I'm-a Want You"	Bread	3	November 27	5
November 20	"Got to Be There"	Michael Jackson	4	December 11	9
November 27	"Desiderata"	Les Crane	8	December 4	3
November 27	"Rock Steady"	Aretha Franklin	9	November 27	2
December 4	"An Old Fashioned Love Song"	Three Dog Night	4	December 18	5
December 11	"Brand New Key"	Melanie	1	December 25	10
December 11	"All I Ever Need Is You"	Sonny & Cher	7	December 25	3
December 18	"Cherish"	David Cassidy	9	December 25	4

=== 1970 peaks ===
List of Billboard Hot 100 top ten singles in 1971 which peaked in 1970
Top ten entry date	Single	Artist(s)	Peak	Peak date	Weeks in top ten
November 7	"I Think I Love You"	The Partridge Family	1	November 21	11
November 14	"The Tears of a Clown"	Smokey Robinson & The Miracles	1	December 12	10
November 14	"Gypsy Woman"	Brian Hyland	3	December 5	8
December 5	"One Less Bell to Answer"	The 5th Dimension	2	December 26	10
December 12	"My Sweet Lord" / "Isn't It a Pity"	George Harrison	1	December 26	10
December 19	"Stoned Love"	The Supremes	7	December 19	5

=== 1972 peaks ===
List of Billboard Hot 100 top ten singles in 1971 which peaked in 1972
Top ten entry date	Single	Artist(s)	Peak	Peak date	Weeks in top ten
December 18	"American Pie"	Don McLean	1	January 15	11
December 25	"Scorpio"	Dennis Coffey	6	January 8	6
December 25	"Hey Girl" / "I Knew You When"	Donny Osmond	9	January 15	4

== See also ==
- 1971 in music
- List of Billboard Hot 100 number ones of 1971
- Billboard Year-End Hot 100 singles of 1971
