= Edna Wright =

American singer (1945–2020)

- Wright in 2011

Background information
- Born: February 2, 1945; Los Angeles, California, U.S.
- Died: September 12, 2020 (aged 75) Encino, California, U.S.
- Genres: R&B; soul; pop
- Occupation: Singer
- Instrument: Vocals
- Years active: 1962–2020
- Labels: Canterbury; Philles; RCA

Edna Wright (February 2, 1945 – September 12, 2020) was an American singer, best known as the lead singer of Honey Cone, the girl group that went to No. 1 on the Billboard Hot 100 with the song "Want Ads" in 1971. She was the younger sister of singer Darlene Love. Wright sang backup for various artists, including the Righteous Brothers, Ray Charles, and Cher.

== Life and career ==
Edna Wright, a Los Angeles native, grew up singing in the church. Her father, Bishop J.W. Wright, was a pastor at King's Holiness Chapel in Los Angeles. In 1960, she began singing in a gospel group called The COGIC (Church of God in Christ) singers.

Through her older sister, Darlene Love, Wright met producer Phil Spector. Jack Nitzsche, an associate of Spector, produced her first feature recording in 1964. Wright sang lead on "Yes Sir, That's My Baby" by Hale and the Hushabyes which was a pseudonym for a group that included Brian Wilson, Sonny & Cher, Jackie DeShannon. Under the stage name Sandy Wynns she released her debut solo single "A Touch of Venus" on Champion Records, which led to a nationwide nightclub tour. She then became a backing vocalist for the Righteous Brothers, Johnny Rivers, and Ray Charles. Charles asked her to join the Raelettes, his female backing group.

In 1967, she released the single, "How Could Something Be So Bad and Always Feel So Good" backed with "Love is Like Quicksand" on the Canterbury label.

In 1968, Wright's sister Darlene Love was scheduled to appear on an Andy Williams TV special. She was unable to attend, so she asked Wright to fill in for her. Wright asked Carolyn Willis and Shelly Clark to join her for the appearance. She also contacted Eddie Holland, who recently left Motown Records along with Brian Holland and Lamont Dozier to form HDH Records, to watch the show. Impressed by Wright, Holland offered her a contract, but she preferred to be in a group. He signed the trio to Hot Wax Records. They released their debut single, "While You're Out Looking for Sugar", in 1969. But their biggest success came in 1971 when they topped the Billboard Hot 100 with the hit "Want Ads" from the album Soulful Tapestry. The song spent one week at No. 1, and also spent three weeks atop the R&B chart. The record was certified gold by the RIAA, and their next single "Stick-Up," also went gold. The trio split up in 1973.

Wright married musician Greg Perry, who co-wrote and produced many of Honey Cone's recordings at Hot Wax. In 1977, she released her only solo album, Oops! Here I Go Again, on RCA Victor, which Perry produced.

In the 1980s and 1990s, Wright sang backup for various musical acts, including U2, Kim Carnes, Aaron Neville and Andraé Crouch.

On September 18, 2016, Wright along with Clark were honored with the 2016 National Rhythm and Blues Music Society Unsung Heroine Awards at their Black Tie Gala, Dinner & Awards Ceremony at the Double Tree by Hilton in Philadelphia, PA. Willis, who was not in attendance received an award as well.

On September 24, 2017, Wright and Clark were honored with the Heroes and Legends Award (HAL) in Music at The Beverly Hill Hilton in Beverly Hills, CA.

On September 12, 2020, Wright died suddenly, at age 75 after suffering a heart attack at a hospital in Encino, California. She suffered from chronic obstructive pulmonary disease. Her sister Darlene Love released a statement on her Facebook page: "I'm in complete shock and so heartbroken by the sudden loss of my beautiful baby sister Edna. Please keep me and my family in your prayers during this very sad time for us."

On January 8, 2021, Honey Cone was inducted into the Soul Music Hall Of Fame Class of 2020.

== Discography ==
=== Albums ===
- 1966: The Cogics – It's a Blessing (Exodus Records)
- 1977: Oops! Here I Go Again (RCA Victor)

=== Singles ===
- 1964: "The Touch of Venus" / "A Lover's Quarrel" (Champion 14001)
- 1964: "Love Belongs to Everyone" / "Yes I Really Love You" (Champion 14002)
- 1977: "You Can't See the Forest (for the Trees)" / "Nothing Comes to a Sleeper (But A Dream)" (RCA 11014)

=== Backing vocal credits ===
- 1969: Stan Kenton – Hair
- 1969: The Righteous Brothers – Re-Birth
- 1971: Al Kooper – New York City (You're a Woman)
- 1974: Freda Payne – Payne & Pleasure
- 1974: Nancy Wilson – All In Love Is Fair
- 1974: Stanley Turrentine – Pieces of Dreams
- 1975: Betty Everett – Happy Endings
- 1975: Stanley Turrentine – In the Pocket
- 1975: Cher – Stars
- 1979: Elkie Brooks – Live and Learn
- 1980: Kim Carnes – Romance Dance
- 1982: Andraé Crouch – Finally
- 1988: Darlene Love – Paint Another Picture
- 1988: U2 – Rattle and Hum
- 1988: U2 – "Desire (Hollywood Remix)"
- 1993: Aaron Neville – The Grand Tour
- 2017: Mike Love – Unleash the Love
