= Billboard Year-End Hot 100 singles of 1971 =

Ranking of recorded music

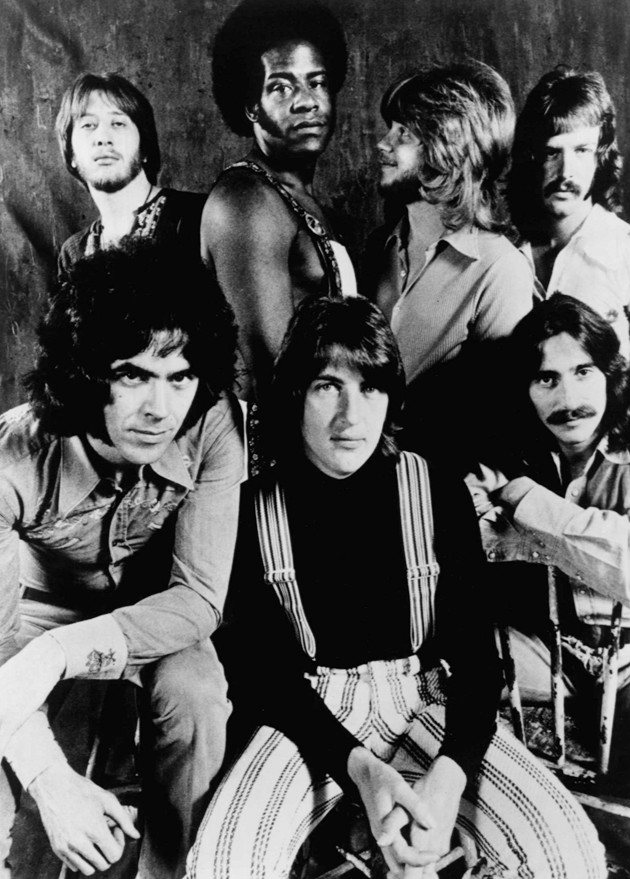
Three Dog Night had two songs on the Year-End Hot 100, including "Joy to the World", the number one song of 1971.

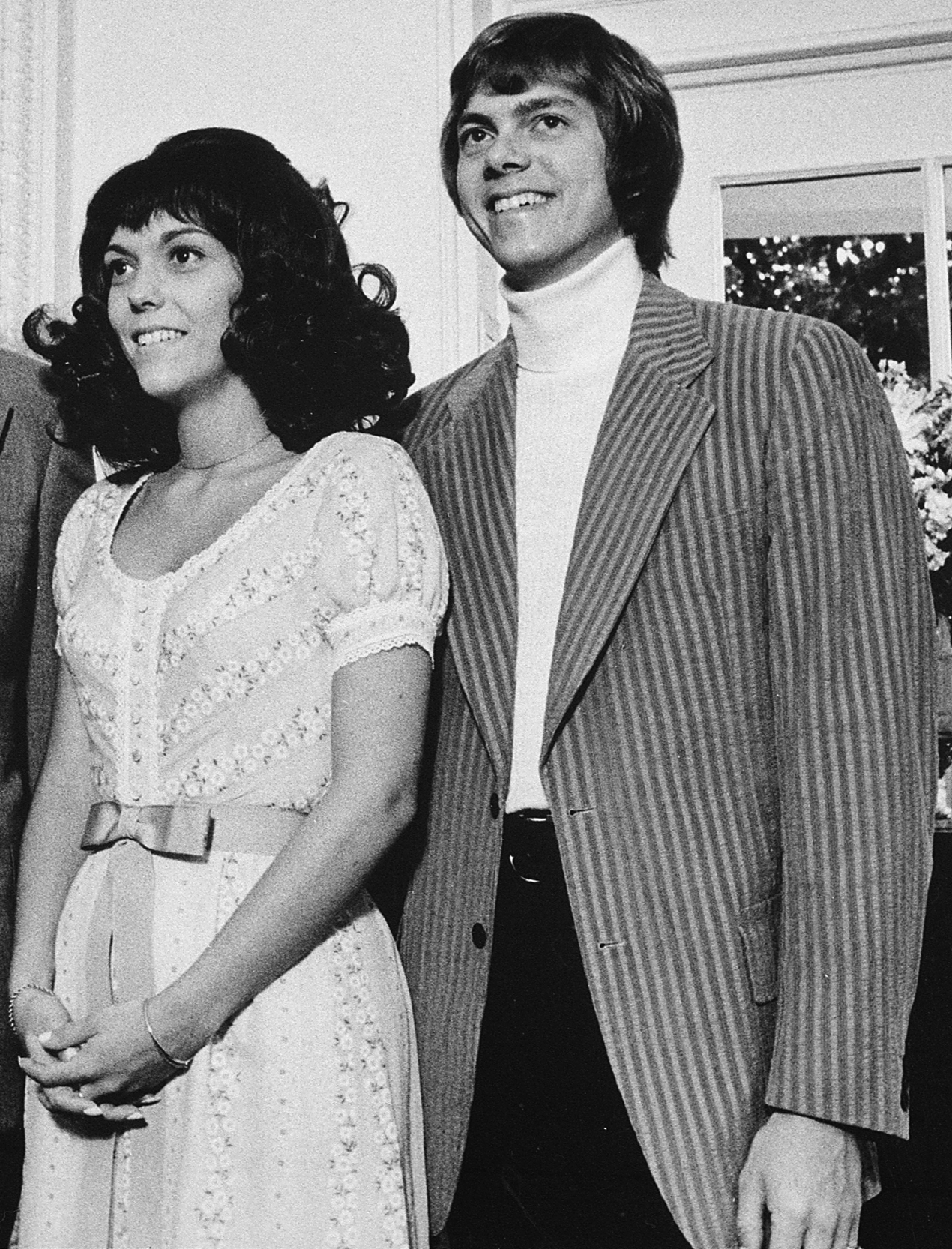
The Carpenters had three songs on the Year-End Hot 100, the most of any artist in 1971.

This is a list of Billboard magazine's Top Hot 100 singles of 1971. The Top 100, as revealed in the year-end edition of Billboard dated December 25, 1971, is based on Hot 100 charts from the issue dates of January 2 through November 27, 1971.

No.	Title	Artist(s)
1	"Joy to the World"	Three Dog Night
2	"Maggie May"/"Reason to Believe"	Rod Stewart
3	"It's Too Late"/"I Feel the Earth Move"	Carole King
4	"One Bad Apple"	The Osmonds
5	"How Can You Mend a Broken Heart"	Bee Gees
6	"Indian Reservation (The Lament of the Cherokee Reservation Indian)"	Raiders
7	"Go Away Little Girl"	Donny Osmond
8	"Take Me Home, Country Roads"	John Denver
9	"Just My Imagination (Running Away with Me)"	The Temptations
10	"Knock Three Times"	Tony Orlando and Dawn
11	"Me and Bobby McGee"	Janis Joplin
12	"Tired of Being Alone"	Al Green
13	"Want Ads"	Honey Cone
14	"Smiling Faces Sometimes"	The Undisputed Truth
15	"Treat Her Like a Lady"	Cornelius Brothers & Sister Rose
16	"Brown Sugar"	The Rolling Stones
17	"You've Got a Friend"	James Taylor
18	"Mr. Big Stuff"	Jean Knight
19	"Do You Know What I Mean"	Lee Michaels
20	"The Night They Drove Old Dixie Down"	Joan Baez
21	"What's Going On"	Marvin Gaye
22	"Uncle Albert/Admiral Halsey"	Paul & Linda McCartney
23	"Ain't No Sunshine"	Bill Withers
24	"Signs"	Five Man Electrical Band
25	"She's a Lady"	Tom Jones
26	"I've Found Someone of My Own"	The Free Movement
27	"Superstar"	Murray Head
28	"Amos Moses"	Jerry Reed
29	"Temptation Eyes"	The Grass Roots
30	"Superstar"	The Carpenters
31	"My Sweet Lord"/"Isn't It A Pity"	George Harrison
32	"Sweet and Innocent"	Donny Osmond
33	"Put Your Hand in the Hand"	Ocean
34	"Chick-A-Boom (Don't Ya Jes' Love It)"	Daddy Dewdrop
35	"For All We Know"	The Carpenters
36	"If You Could Read My Mind"	Gordon Lightfoot
37	"Help Me Make It Through the Night"	Sammi Smith
38	"Rainy Days and Mondays"	The Carpenters
39	"Gypsys, Tramps & Thieves"	Cher
40	"Never Can Say Goodbye"	The Jackson 5
41	"Rose Garden"	Lynn Anderson
42	"Don't Pull Your Love"	Hamilton, Joe Frank & Reynolds
43	"It Don't Come Easy"	Ringo Starr
44	"Mr. Bojangles"	Nitty Gritty Dirt Band
45	"I Love You for All Seasons"	The Fuzz
46	"Whatcha See Is Whatcha Get"	The Dramatics
47	"That's the Way I've Always Heard It Should Be"	Carly Simon
48	"If You Really Love Me"	Stevie Wonder
49	"Spanish Harlem"	Aretha Franklin
50	"I Don't Know How to Love Him"	Helen Reddy
51	"Yo-Yo"	The Osmonds
52	"Bridge over Troubled Water"	Aretha Franklin
53	"Doesn't Somebody Want to Be Wanted"	The Partridge Family
54	"Draggin' the Line"	Tommy James
55	"Proud Mary"	Ike & Tina Turner
56	"Beginnings"/"Colour My World"	Chicago
57	"Stay Awhile"	The Bells
58	"Sweet City Woman"	The Stampeders
59	"Me and You and a Dog Named Boo"	Lobo
60	"Another Day"/"Oh Woman, Oh Why"	Paul McCartney
61	"If"	Bread
62	"Mercy Mercy Me (The Ecology)"	Marvin Gaye
63	"One Toke Over the Line"	Brewer & Shipley
64	"She's Not Just Another Woman"	8th Day
65	"Bring the Boys Home"	Freda Payne
66	"I Just Want to Celebrate"	Rare Earth
67	"Never Ending Song of Love"	Delaney & Bonnie & Friends
68	"Easy Loving"	Freddie Hart
69	"Liar"	Three Dog Night
70	"Stick-Up"	Honey Cone
71	"Chirpy Chirpy Cheep Cheep"	Mac and Katie Kissoon
72	"(Where Do I Begin?) Love Story"	Andy Williams
73	"Wild World"	Cat Stevens
74	"When You're Hot, You're Hot"	Jerry Reed
75	"Funky Nassau"	The Beginning of the End
76	"If Not for You"	Olivia Newton-John
77	"Groove Me"	King Floyd
78	"Watching Scotty Grow"	Bobby Goldsboro
79	"Woodstock"	Matthews Southern Comfort
80	"Amazing Grace"	Judy Collins
81	"I Hear You Knocking"	Dave Edmunds
82	"Lonely Days"	Bee Gees
83	"Here Comes That Rainy Day Feeling Again"	The Fortunes
84	"Won't Get Fooled Again"	The Who
85	"Trapped By a Thing Called Love"	Denise LaSalle
86	"Mama's Pearl"	The Jackson 5
87	"Timothy"	The Buoys
88	"I Woke Up In Love This Morning"	The Partridge Family
89	"Theme from Shaft"	Isaac Hayes
90	"If I Were Your Woman"	Gladys Knight & the Pips
91	"I Am...I Said"	Neil Diamond
92	"The Wedding Song (There Is Love)"	Paul Stookey
93	"Don't Knock My Love"	Wilson Pickett
94	"Love Her Madly"	The Doors
95	"Here Comes the Sun"	Richie Havens
96	"Sweet Mary"	Wadsworth Mansion
97	"Right on the Tip of My Tongue"	Brenda & the Tabulations
98	"One Less Bell to Answer"	The 5th Dimension
99	"Riders on the Storm"	The Doors
100	"It's Impossible"	Perry Como

== See also ==
- 1971 in music
- Billboard Year-End Best Selling Soul Singles of 1971
- List of Billboard Hot 100 number-one singles of 1971
- List of Billboard Hot 100 top-ten singles in 1971
