= Shelly Clark =

American singer and dancer (born 1947)

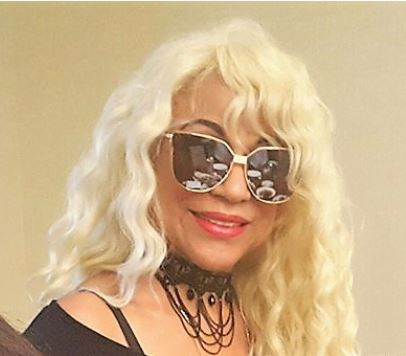
- Clark in 2016

Background information
- Born: July 27, 1947 (age 78); Brooklyn, New York, U.S.
- Genres: R&B; soul; pop; calypso
- Occupations: Singer; dancer; actress
- Instrument: Vocals
- Years active: 1953–present
- Labels: Columbia, Hot Wax Invictus

External videos
- "Here Comes The Rain Again"

Shelly Clark (born July 27, 1947) is an American singer, dancer and actress, best known as a founding member of the 1970s R&B girls group, Honey Cone who had the No. 1 Billboard Hot 100 hit single, "Want Ads" released in March 1971.

== Early life ==
Shelly was born Mashelle Clark in Brooklyn, New York on July 27, 1947. Her mother Lilly Gainen-Clark a Russian Jew was a concert pianist. Her father Edward Evans Clark from Barbados was a self taught dancer singer and entertainer. Clark had an older brother Ilya Clark who was born in 1945. The family moved from Brooklyn to Los Angeles, California in 1957.

== Career ==
=== Early career ===
Clark began her career as a dancer, singer and actress at age 6. At age 7 she and her brother were cast in the hit Broadway musical House of Flowers which starred Pearl Bailey and Diahann Carroll. The musical ran every night for 8 months.

Clark and her brother were known as The Clark Kids. Their father became their dance trainer and manager. In 1957, The Clark Kids were signed to Columbia Records as Elia and Michele Clark. They recorded an album entitled Calypso Songs For Children.

In 1957, 9-year-old Clark was cast as part of the Cotton Club Revue of 1957. In the revue, she sang the song "Evalina" and shared the stage with Cab Calloway. Clark was the youngest performer in the cast and the youngest to perform at Palace Theatre and The Apollo in New York. The Cotton Club Revue was a 7-month national tour.

While attending the University of Southern California on a scholarship for talented singers, Clark worked as a session vocalist to make some extra money. During this time Clark was asked to audition for the Ike & Tina Turner Revue in 1966. The audition took place at her home and she was hired on the spot to be an Ikette. Although, Clark never recorded as an Ikette, she did perform with the Revue until a near fatal bus crash in Wichita, Kansas. While Clark was recuperating, new Ikettes were hired and the tour continued without her. After recuperating, Clark was hired as lead dancer to tour with the Little Richard Revue. She also recorded and toured with various artist, including Dusty Springfield on her Canadian tour, and with Bill Medley in Las Vegas.

Clark was a featured singer on the recording "MacArthur Park" by Richard Harris. She also performed with Tom Jones.

=== Honey Cone ===
In 1968, Clark met singer Carolyn Willis through long-time industry veteran Sherlie Mae Matthews. The trio formed a girl's group called The Cover Girls and performed in local clubs and theaters.

Singer Edna Wright asked Clark and Willis to appear with her on The Andy Williams Show in 1968. In addition, Wright asked Eddie Holland of the newly formed Invictus Records and formerly of Motown Records to watch the show. Holland was so impressed that he convinced the girls to start a group. He gave the trio the name Honey Cone with Wright as lead singer.

During a break from recording with Honey Cone in Detroit, the group went back to Los Angeles and Clark was hired as a regular on the TV show The Jim Nabors Hour.

In May 1969, Honey Cone's debut single "While You're Out Looking for Sugar" was released on Hot Wax Records. It spent 8 weeks on Billboard's R&B chart and peaked at No. 26 on August 16, 1969. The follow-up "Girls, It Ain't Easy" was released in September 1969, and peaked at No. 8 on November 16, 1969, on the R&B chart after appearing for 9 weeks.

In 1971, Clark had to abruptly leave The Jim Nabors Hour when the Honey Cone's single "Want Ads" climbed the charts, knocking The Rolling Stones' "Brown Sugar" out of the No. 1 spot. "Want Ads" proved to be their biggest success, spending 14 weeks on the charts and topping the R&B and Pop charts, and selling over one million copies. It was certified gold by the R.I.A.A. in May 1971. "Stick-Up," which also sold more than one million units, was another No. 1 R&B hit and No. 11 Pop. Honey Cone had further chart success with "One Monkey Don't Stop No Show" (No. 15 Pop, No. 5 R&B) and "The Day I Found Myself" (No. 23 Pop, No. 8 R&B).

Clark along with Wright and Willis appeared on the September 2, 1971 cover of Jet Magazine.

By 1973, Honey Cone had 4 top 40 Billboard Hot 100 hits and 9 top 40 Billboard R&B hits, but the group disbanded that year, starting with Willis who was dissatisfied with the lack of control over her career. Soon after, Hot Wax Records folded.

=== Post-Honey Cone ===
In 1973, Mary Wilson of The Supremes asked Clark to join the group following the departures of Jean Terrell and Lynda Laurence. Clark declined citing she "didn't want to do the group thing again." Wilson ended up hiring Clark's label mate Scherrie Payne of the Glass House.

In 1978, Clark was a regular on the disco television show, Hot City, as a singer, dancer and occasional host.

In 1990, the trio attempted a reunion with all three original members, however, that fell apart due to creative differences. .

In 2014, Clark and Wright along with Melodye Perry (Wright's daughter) reunited to perform on the Soul Train Cruise.

On September 18, 2016, Clark and Wright were honored with the 2016 National Rhythm and Blues Music Society Unsung Heroine Award at their Black Tie Gala, Dinner & Awards Ceremony at the Double Tree by Hilton in Philadelphia, PA. Willis, who wasn't in attendance received an award as well.

On September 24, 2017, Clark along with Wright were honored with the Heroes and Legends Award (HAL) in Music as Honey Cone at The Beverly Hill Hotel in Beverly Hills, CA.

On September 12, 2020, Clark's band-mate and friend Edna Wright died at Encino Medical Hospital due to chronic pulmonary issues and suffered a heart attack.

On 8, January 2021, Honey Cone was inducted into the Soul Music Hall Of Fame Class of 2020.

Mayor John Hamilton proclaimed February 1, 2021, Verdine White and Shelly Clark day in Bloomington, Indiana.

On November 16, 2024, Honey Cone released a new single entitled, "Here Comes The Rain Again", which is a cover of the Eurythmics 1984 hit song. Clark along with new Honey Cone members Kathy Merrick and Wendy Smith-Brune share the lead and background vocals throughout the song. Earth, Wind & Fire's bassist Verdine White along with John Paris (drummer for Earth, Wind & Fire) and Neal H. Pouge are the producers of the remake. The single is Honey Cone's first release in 50 years.

Clark is credited as the producer on her husband Verdine White's first ever solo project entitled, "Superman", which was released on December 19, 2024. White is a founding member and bassist of Earth, Wind & Fire. The song was written by White, Motown's songwriter Janie Bradford, and Carnell Harrell in honor of his late brother and founder of Earth, Wind & Fire Maurice White.

== Personal life ==
Clark married Rock and Roll Hall of Famer Verdine White, founding member and bassist of Earth, Wind & Fire, in their Bel Air, California, home on December 31, 1980. They have a son and granddaughter.

== Discography ==
=== Albums ===
- 1957: Elia and Michele Clark – Calypso Songs for Children (Columbia)

=== Backing vocal credits ===
- 1969: Tommy Roe – Dizzy
- 1976: Bobby Glenn – Shout It Out
- 1979: Carrie Lucas – In Danceland

=== Producer ===
- 2024: Verdine White - "Superman"

== Filmography and television ==
- 1959: The Green Pastures - angel
- 1968: The Andy Williams Show - back-up singer
- 1969–1971: The Jim Nabors Hour - regular dancer and singer
- 1978: Hot City Television Show - singer, dancer and occasional host
- 1989: CBS Summer Playhouse (TV Series) episode, Coming To America - dialogue coach
