= Billboard Year-End Best Selling Soul Singles of 1971 =

American music chart

This is a list of Billboard magazine's Top Best Selling Soul Singles of 1971.

No.	Title	Artist(s)
1	"Mr. Big Stuff"	Jean Knight
2	"What's Going On"	Marvin Gaye
3	"Want Ads"	Honey Cone
4	"Tired of Being Alone"	Al Green
5	"Spanish Harlem"	Aretha Franklin
6	"Just My Imagination (Running Away with Me)"	The Temptations
7	"Bridge over Troubled Water"	Aretha Franklin
8	"Thin Line Between Love and Hate"	The Persuaders
9	"Never Can Say Goodbye"	The Jackson 5
10	"Make It Funky"	James Brown
11	"Groove Me"	King Floyd
12	"Trapped by a Thing Called Love"	Denise LaSalle
13	"Don't Knock My Love"	Wilson Pickett
14	"Stick-Up"	Honey Cone
15	"(Do the) Push and Pull"	Rufus Thomas
16	"Mercy Mercy Me (The Ecology)"	Marvin Gaye
17	"Smiling Faces Sometimes"	The Undisputed Truth
18	"She's Not Just Another Woman"	8th Day
19	"Whatcha See Is Whatcha Get"	The Dramatics
20	"The Love We Had (Stays on My Mind)"	The Dells
21	"Ain't No Sunshine"	Bill Withers
22	"Don't Let the Green Grass Fool You"	Wilson Pickett
23	"Love the One You're With"	The Isley Brothers
24	"Hot Pants"	James Brown
25	"I Don't Want to Do Wrong"	Gladys Knight & the Pips
26	"The Breakdown (Part 1)"	Rufus Thomas
27	"We Can Work It Out"	Stevie Wonder
28	"If You Really Love Me"	Stevie Wonder
29	"If I Were Your Woman"	Gladys Knight & the Pips
30	"Women's Love Rights"	Laura Lee
31	"Mama's Pearl"	The Jackson 5
32	"Jody's Got Your Girl and Gone"	Johnnie Taylor
33	"You're a Big Girl Now"	The Stylistics
34	"(For God's Sake) Give More Power to the People"	The Chi-Lites
35	"Your Time to Cry"	Joe Simon
36	"Soul Power"	King Floyd
37	"She's All I Got"	Freddie North
38	"You've Got a Friend"	Roberta Flack and Donny Hathaway
39	"You've Got to Crawl (Before You Walk)"	8th Day
40	"Inner City Blues (Make Me Wanna Holler)"	Marvin Gaye
41	"Do Me Right"	The Detroit Emeralds
42	"Heavy Makes You Happy"	The Staple Singers
43	"Funky Nassau"	The Beginning of the End
44	"I Know I'm In Love"	Chee-Chee and Peppy
45	"Right on the Tip of My Tongue"	Brenda & the Tabulations
46	"Spinning Around (I Must Be Falling in Love)"	The Main Ingredient
47	"I Likes to Do It"	People's Choice
48	"One Bad Apple"	The Osmonds
49	"Stop, Look, Listen (To Your Heart)"	The Stylistics
50	"Precious, Precious"	Jackie Moore

== See also ==
- 1971 in music
- Billboard Year-End Hot 100 singles of 1971
- List of Best Selling Soul Singles number ones of 1971
