= List of Best Selling Soul Singles number ones of 1971 =

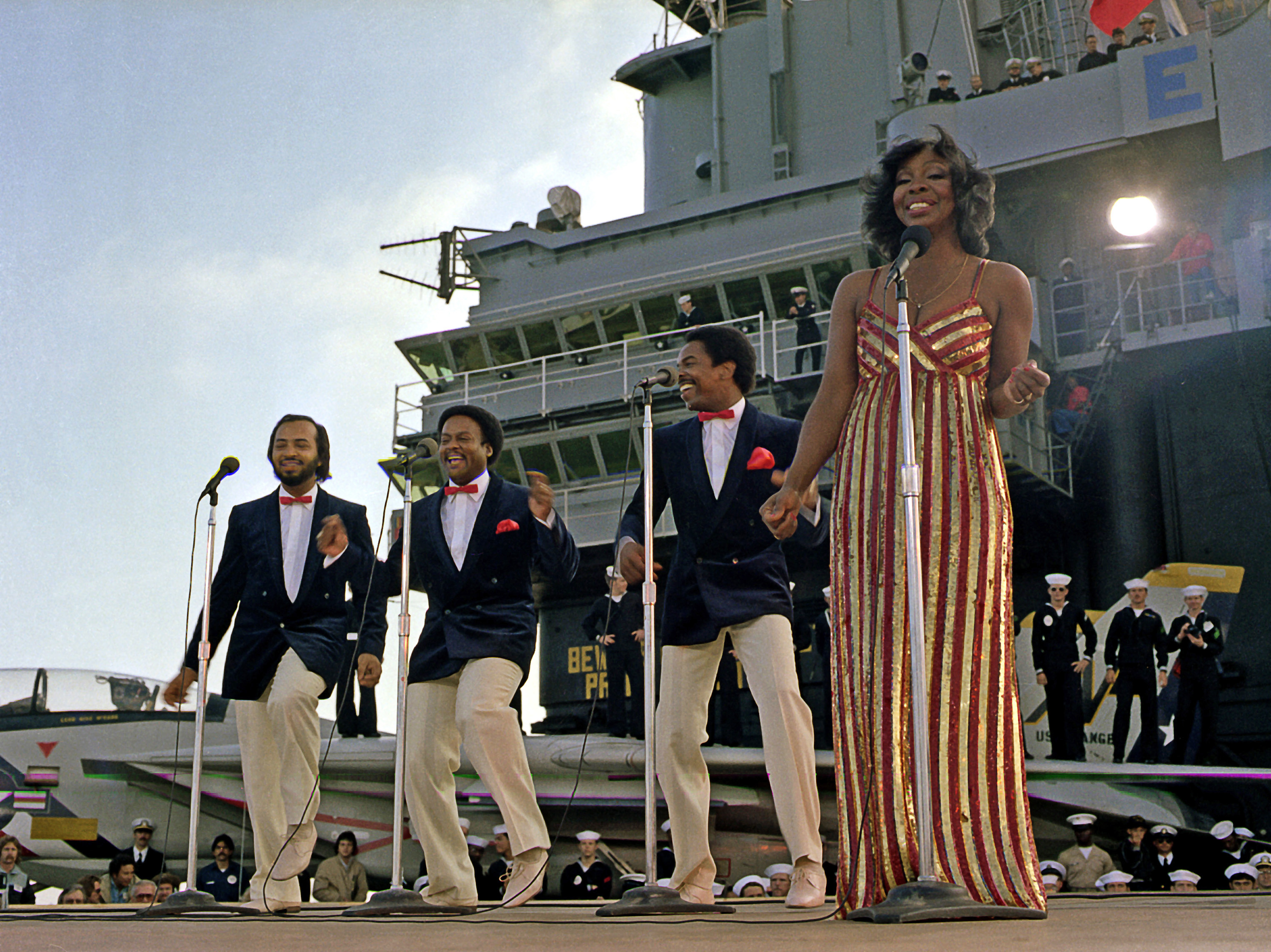
Gladys Knight & the Pips topped the chart with "If I Were Your Woman".

Billboard published a weekly chart in 1971 ranking the top-performing singles in the United States in soul music and related African American-oriented music genres; the chart has undergone various name changes over the decades to reflect the evolution of such genres and since 2005 has been published as Hot R&B/Hip-Hop Songs. In 1971, it was published under the title Best Selling Soul Singles, and 21 different singles topped the chart.

In the issue of Billboard dated January 2, King Floyd reached number one with "Groove Me", displacing the final number one of 1970, "Stoned Love" by the Supremes. It held the top spot for three weeks, was replaced for a single week by "If I Were Your Woman" by Gladys Knight & the Pips, and then returned to number one for one further week. "Groove Me" was Floyd's first number one but proved to be his only single to reach the top spot. It was replaced at number one by "(Do The) Push and Pull (Part 1)" by Rufus Thomas, another first-time chart-topper. Thomas had first recorded in 1941, but did not achieve his greatest success until the early 1970s, when he was well into his 50s; as with Floyd, his 1971 number one was his only chart-topping single. Honey Cone, Jean Knight, Denise LaSalle, the Persuaders, and the Chi-Lites also reached number one in 1971 for the first time in their respective careers.

Two singles tied for the year's longest-running number one, both spending five weeks atop the chart. In March and April, Marvin Gaye spent five weeks at number one with "What's Going On" and Jean Knight achieved the same feat in with "Mr. Big Stuff" beginning with the issue dated July 3. Gaye had the highest cumulative total number of weeks atop the chart of any act in 1971, spending a total of nine weeks in the top spot with "What's Going On", "Mercy Mercy Me (The Ecology)" and "Inner City Blues (Make Me Wanna Holler)". All three tracks were taken from the album What's Going On, a politically charged concept album which has been regarded by many critics as one of the greatest albums of all time. Three other acts achieved more than one number one in 1971: James Brown, Aretha Franklin, and Honey Cone. The year's final soul number one was "Family Affair" by Sly and the Family Stone, which reached number one in the issue of Billboard dated December 4 and stayed there for the remainder of the year. It also topped the all-genre Hot 100 chart, as did "Just My Imagination (Running Away with Me)" by the Temptations and Honey Cone's "Want Ads".

== Chart history ==
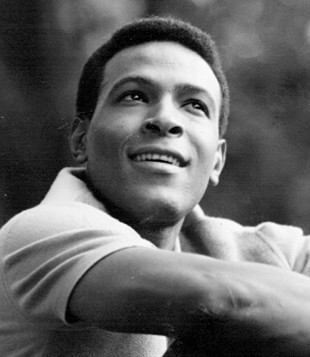
Marvin Gaye spent nine weeks at number one in 1971.

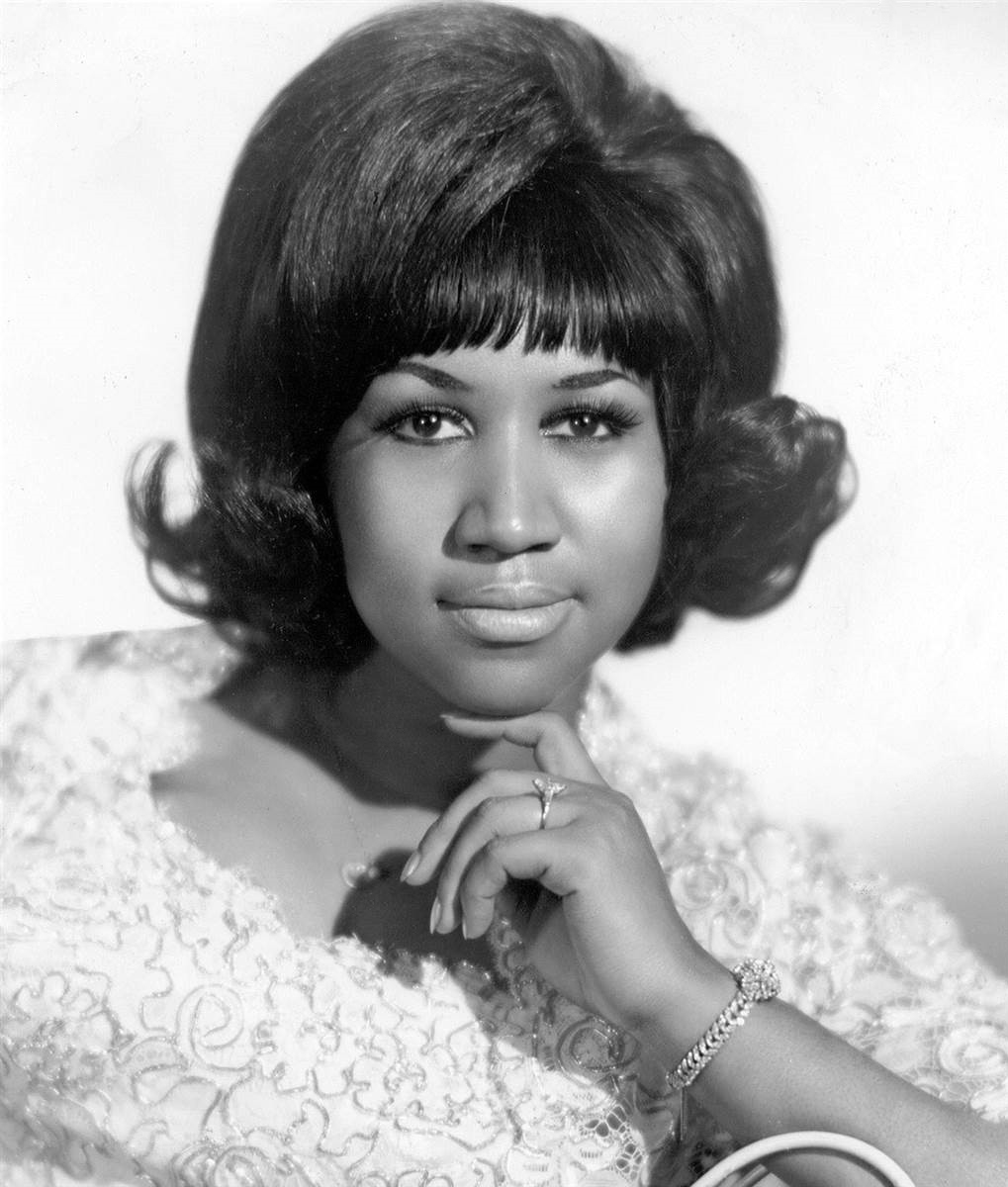
Aretha Franklin reached number one with her versions of "Bridge over Troubled Water" and "Spanish Harlem".

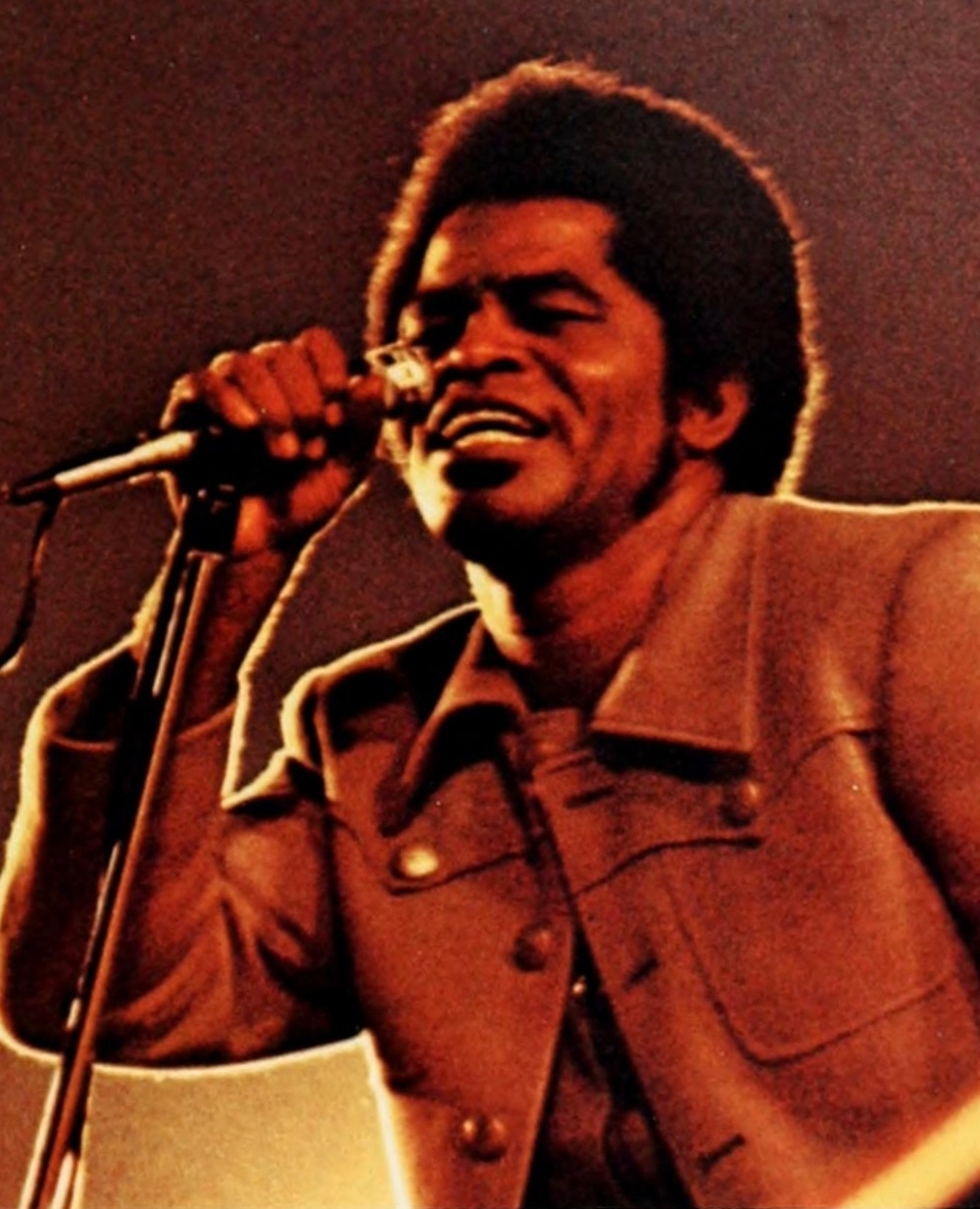
James Brown had two number ones during 1971.

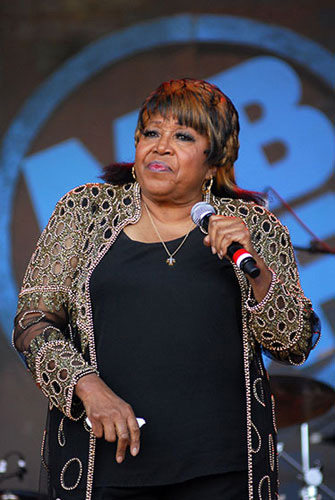
Denise LaSalle (pictured in 2009) gained her first number one with "Trapped by a Thing Called Love".

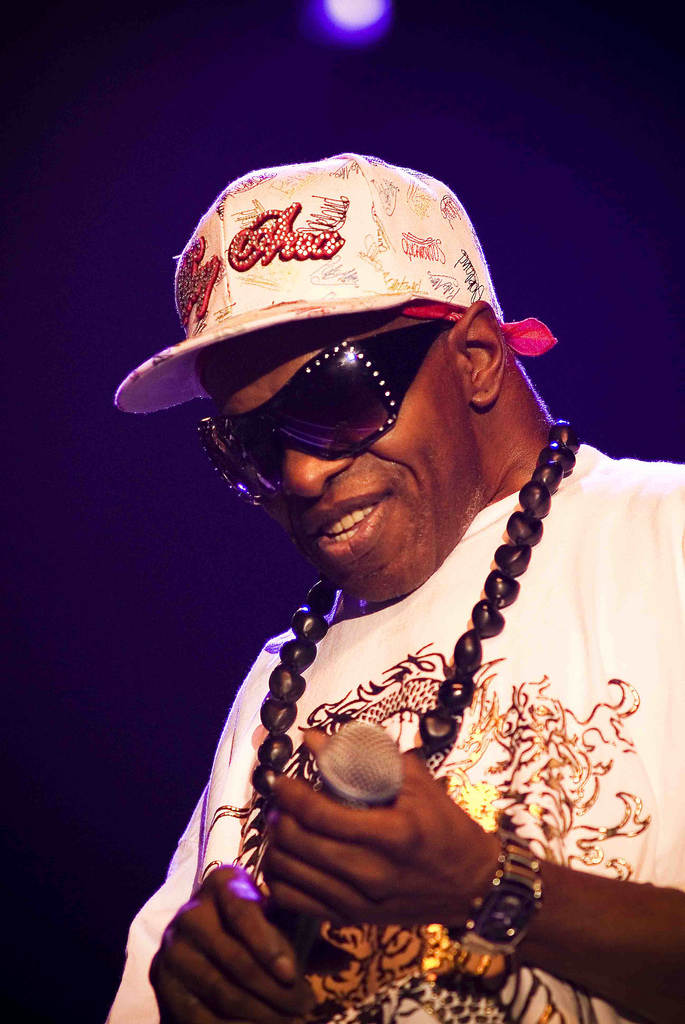
Sly and the Family Stone (Sly Stone pictured in 2007) had the year's last chart-topper with "Family Affair".

Key
†	Indicates number 1 on Billboard's year-end soul chart of 1971

Chart history
Issue date	Title	Artist(s)	Ref.
January 2	"Groove Me"	King Floyd	
January 9	"Groove Me"	King Floyd	
January 16	"Groove Me"	King Floyd	
January 23	"If I Were Your Woman"	Gladys Knight & the Pips	
January 30	"Groove Me"	King Floyd	
February 6	"(Do The) Push and Pull (Part 1)"	Rufus Thomas	
February 13	"(Do The) Push and Pull (Part 1)"	Rufus Thomas	
February 20	"Jody's Got Your Girl And Gone"	Johnnie Taylor	
February 27	"Jody's Got Your Girl And Gone"	Johnnie Taylor	
March 6	"Just My Imagination (Running Away with Me)"	The Temptations	
March 13	"Just My Imagination (Running Away with Me)"	The Temptations	
March 20	"Just My Imagination (Running Away with Me)"	The Temptations	
March 27	"What's Going On"	Marvin Gaye	
April 3	"What's Going On"	Marvin Gaye	
April 10	"What's Going On"	Marvin Gaye	
April 17	"What's Going On"	Marvin Gaye	
April 24	"What's Going On"	Marvin Gaye	
May 1	"Never Can Say Goodbye"	The Jackson 5	
May 8	"Never Can Say Goodbye"	The Jackson 5	
May 15	"Never Can Say Goodbye"	The Jackson 5	
May 22	"Bridge Over Troubled Water"	Aretha Franklin	
May 29	"Want Ads"	Honey Cone	
June 5	"Want Ads"	Honey Cone	
June 12	"Want Ads"	Honey Cone	
June 19	"Bridge Over Troubled Water"	Aretha Franklin	
June 26	"Don't Knock My Love (Part 1)"	Wilson Pickett	
July 3	"Mr. Big Stuff" †	Jean Knight	
July 10	"Mr. Big Stuff" †	Jean Knight	
July 17	"Mr. Big Stuff" †	Jean Knight	
July 24	"Mr. Big Stuff" †	Jean Knight	
July 31	"Mr. Big Stuff" †	Jean Knight	
August 7	"Hot Pants Part 1 (She Got To Use What She Got, To Get What She Want)"	James Brown	
August 14	"Mercy Mercy Me (The Ecology)"	Marvin Gaye	
August 21	"Mercy Mercy Me (The Ecology)"	Marvin Gaye	
August 28	"Spanish Harlem"	Aretha Franklin	
September 4	"Spanish Harlem"	Aretha Franklin	
September 11	"Spanish Harlem"	Aretha Franklin	
September 18	"Stick-Up"	Honey Cone	
September 25	"Stick-Up"	Honey Cone	
October 2	"Make It Funky (Part 1)"	James Brown	
October 9	"Make It Funky (Part 1)"	James Brown	
October 16	"Thin Line Between Love and Hate"	The Persuaders	
October 23	"Thin Line Between Love and Hate"	The Persuaders	
October 30	"Trapped by a Thing Called Love"	Denise LaSalle	
November 6	"Inner City Blues (Make Me Wanna Holler)"	Marvin Gaye	
November 13	"Inner City Blues (Make Me Wanna Holler)"	Marvin Gaye	
November 20	"Have You Seen Her"	The Chi-Lites	
November 27	"Have You Seen Her"	The Chi-Lites	
December 4	"Family Affair"	Sly and the Family Stone	
December 11	"Family Affair"	Sly and the Family Stone	
December 18	"Family Affair"	Sly and the Family Stone	
December 25	"Family Affair"	Sly and the Family Stone	

== See also ==
- Billboard Year-End Best Selling Soul Singles of 1971
- List of Billboard Hot 100 number-one singles of 1971
