= Animalization =

Studio album by the Animals
- Released: August 1966
- Recorded: 9 January – 4 July 1966
- Genre: Rock; blues rock; rhythm and blues
- Length: 40:16
- Label: MGM
- Producer: Tom Wilson

The Animals US chronology
The Best of The Animals (1966)	Animalization (1966)	Animalism (1966)

Singles from Animalization
- 1. "Inside-Looking Out" Released: 11 February 1966; 2. "Don't Bring Me Down" Released: 13 April 1966; 3. "See See Rider" Released: 1966

Animalization is a studio album by the English rock band the Animals. The band's fourth American release, it was issued in August 1966 on MGM Records.

== Overview ==
It has a track listing somewhat similar to the British album Animalisms. The album, which reached #20 on the US Billboard album chart, included three US Top 40 singles ("Inside-Looking Out", "Don't Bring Me Down", and "See See Rider") and was the first Animals album to have some tracks mixed in true stereo.

It was during this period that drummer John Steel left the group and was replaced by Barry Jenkins, previously of The Nashville Teens (of "Tobacco Road" fame). Both drummers appear on the cover, Jenkins on the front (upper right in brown shirt) and Steel on the back. In addition, it was also during this period that Mickie Most stepped down as the group's producer and was replaced by Tom Wilson.

The album was successful, it peaked at No. 20 on the Billboard Top LPs in late 1966, during a thirty-week stay on the chart.

Professional ratings
Review scores
Source	Rating
Allmusic	link
Encyclopedia of Popular Music	3/5 stars

== Track listing ==
=== Side one ===
Side one
No.	Title	Writer(s)	Length
1.	"Don't Bring Me Down"	Gerry Goffin; Carole King	3:13
2.	"One Monkey Don't Stop No Show"	Joe Tex	3:20
3.	"You're On My Mind"	Eric Burdon; Dave Rowberry	2:54
4.	"Cheating"	Eric Burdon; Chas Chandler	2:23
5.	"She'll Return It" (It is erroneously credited to Barry Jenkins, Rowberry, Burdon, Chandler, Hilton Valentine and is not listed on the back cover)	Eric Burdon; Dave Rowberry	2:47
6.	"Inside-Looking Out"	John Avery Lomax; Alan Lomax; Eric Burdon; Chas Chandler	3:47
Total length:			18:24

Side two
No.	Title	Writer(s)	Length
1.	"See See Rider"	Ma Rainey	3:58
2.	"Gin House Blues"	Harry Burke (aka J. C. Johnson)	4:37
3.	"Maudie"	John Lee Hooker	4:03
4.	"What Am I Living For"	Fred Jay; Art Harris	3:12
5.	"Sweet Little Sixteen"	Chuck Berry	3:07
6.	"I Put a Spell on You"	Screamin' Jay Hawkins	2:55
Total length:			21:52

== Personnel ==
The Animals

- Eric Burdon – vocals
- Dave Rowberry – keyboards
- Hilton Valentine – guitar
- Chas Chandler – bass
- John Steel – drums except as indicated below
- Barry Jenkins – drums on "Don't Bring Me Down", "Cheating" and "See See Rider"

Technical

- Val Valentin – engineer

== Charts ==
Chart (1966)	Peak position
US Billboard Top LPs	20
