= Inside-Looking Out =

1966 single by The Animals

- Germany sleeve art

Single by the Animals

from the album Animalization
- B-side: "Outcast" (UK); "You're on My Mind" (US)
- Released: 11 February 1966
- Recorded: 9 January 1966
- Studio: Lansdowne, London
- Genre: Garage rock, rhythm and blues, psychedelic rock
- Length: 3:44
- Label: Decca
- Songwriters: Eric Burdon; Chas Chandler; Alan Lomax; John Lomax
- Producer: Tom Wilson

The Animals singles chronology
"It's My Life" (1965)	"Inside-Looking Out" (1966)	"Don't Bring Me Down" (1966)

Audio
- "Inside-Looking Out" on YouTube

"Inside-Looking Out", often written "Inside Looking Out", is a 1966 single by the Animals, and their first for Decca Records. It was a moderate hit, reaching number 12 on the UK Singles Chart, number 23 in Canada, and number 34 in the United States on the U.S. pop singles chart. It was the group's final single with drummer John Steel, who left shortly after its release. He was replaced by Barry Jenkins, who would go on to play with Eric Burdon and the Animals.

== Recording ==
"Inside-Looking Out" was taped on 9 January 1966 during a marathon session, together with the tracks "One Monkey Don't Stop No Show", "Maudie", "Outcast", "Sweet Little Sixteen", "You're on My Mind", "Clapping", "Gin House Blues", "Squeeze Her, Tease Her", "What Am I Living For", "I Put a Spell on You", "Thats All I Am to You" and "She'll Return It", all of whom appeared on the Animals third British studio album Animalisms. These recordings were the first ones by the Animals to be produced by Tom Wilson. The sessions were conducted at Lansdowne Studios in Holland Park, London with Adrian Kerridge engineering. The Animals guitarist Hilton Valentine stated that the recording lacked any overdubbing and that the band members were confused during the session, asking "where do we go next?".

== Composition ==
Structural similarity between "Rosie" and "Inside-Looking Out"
"Rosie"
"Rosie", performed by the Animals on BBC Radio.

"Inside-Looking Out"
The single version of "Inside-Looking Out"

The song is very loosely based on a prison work chant entitled "Rosie," attributed to C. B. and Axe Gang, that was collected by musicologist Alan Lomax at the Parchman Farm prison in Mississippi and released in his album Popular Songbook. The Animals had performed "Rosie" on various television shows and radio broadcasts, including at the Richmond Jazz and Blues Festival on 8 August 1965. Valentine reflected that "it [the song] was different every night" and that the "arrangement kept changing". Lead vocalist Eric Burdon and bassist Chas Chandler had "customised" the track during the group's performances of it, primarily writing new lyrics. According to Valentine, it was primarily the lyrics that differentiated "Inside-Looking Out" from "Rosie", opining that it structurally was identical to a recording of "Rosie" he possessed.

As a result, the Animals' interpretation is credited to John and Alan Lomax with Eric Burdon and Chas Chandler.

== Release ==
The Animals premiered "Inside-Looking Out" prior to release on a performance of The Ed Sullivan Show on 6 February 1966 before the single's release, where they performed the song and the prior hit "We Gotta Get Out of This Place". In the UK, "Inside-Looking Out" was released as the Animals' first single on Decca on 11 February 1966. The British release had "Outcast" on the B-side. When MGM Records released the single in the US that same month, "Outcast" was substituted by "You're on My Mind", a song that had been composed by Burdon with keyboardist Dave Rowberry.

== Reception ==
Cash Box described the single as a "raunchy, pulsating blues-soaked plea in which a rejected fella begs his ex-girlfriend to return to him."

Writing in 2001, David Fricke express that the song was brutal "for guys who had no firsthand experience of chain-gang life", opining that for the song's duration, the Animals never sounded more like real animals – vicious, hungry, desperate". Reflecting to Forbes magazine's Jim Clash in 2020, Valentine revealed that "Inside-Looking Out" was his favorite song by the band, stating that "it seems like it'd be boring, but it isn't" and that "It's fun to play".

== Charts ==
Weekly chart performance for "Inside-Looking Out"
Chart (1966)	Peak position
Australia (Kent Music Report)	20
Canada (RPM)	21
France (SNEP)	20
Ireland (The Herald)	8
Malaysia (Radio Malaysia)	8
Netherlands (Veronica Top 40)	24
Singapore (Radio Singapore)	6
Sweden (Kvällstoppen)	14
Sweden (Tio i Topp)	12
UK (Disc Weekly)	8
UK (Melody Maker)	8
UK (New Musical Express)	6
UK (Record Retailer)	12
US Billboard Hot 100	34
US Cash Box Top 100	34
US Record World 100 Top Pops)	32
West Germany (Musikmarkt)	39

== Cover versions ==
- In 2001, Eric Burdon released a live cover on Official Live Bootleg 2000.
- Japanese group sounds band The Mops covered the song on their 1968 album Psychedelic Sound in Japan. The nearly 6-minute version from the album also includes the bass line from The Blues Magoos' (We Ain't Got) Nothin' Yet.
- In 1969 it was covered by Grand Funk Railroad, who on their album Grand Funk added some marijuana references to the lyrics such as changing the original's "rebirth" to "reefer" and "canvas bags" to "nickel bags" ("burlap bags" in later reissues). It was not only their sole UK Top 40 hit, but also a concert staple of the band for years and is included on their Live Album.
- The Ann Arbor, Michigan-based 1960s garage rock band The Rationals covered the song in a medley with Smokestack Lightning. It was released on their 2009 compilation album Think Rational!.
- It was later covered by doom metal band The Obsessed, released on their 1999 compilation album Incarnate and again by the Greenhornes on their 2001 self-titled second album.
- Canadian guitarist Pat Travers also covered the song in 2003 on his album Power Trio.
- The Makers
- The Fleshtones released a cover on Hitsburg USA! in 1996.

== Influences and samples ==
- A reworking of portions of the song was also recorded by the Austrian band Novak's Kapelle in 1969 as "Hypodermic Needle".
- Grand Funk's version is sampled in the songs "Sound of da Police" by KRS-One and "High 5 (Rock the Catskills)" by Beck.
