= Love, Peace & Soul =

Studio album by Honey Cone
- Released: September 1972
- Genre: R&B/Soul/Funk
- Label: Hot Wax; HA-713
- Producer: Greg Perry

Honey Cone chronology
Soulful Tapestry (1971)	Love, Peace & Soul (1972)

Professional ratings
Review scores
Source	Rating
Allmusic	2.5/5 stars

Love, Peace & Soul is the fourth and final studio album by American R&B/Soul/Funk Girl group the Honey Cone. It was released by Hot Wax/Invictus Records in 1972 (see 1972 in music).

== Album information ==
At the time of this album's release, Hot Wax was experiencing troubles in their operation. This time period marked a downward spiral that would eventually put the freshly developed record label out of business permanently the following year. A few sources report that the reason for this pending expiration was that the independent distributors weren't paying up when it came to royalties from radio play and record sales. The album proved to be the group's biggest failure both critically and commercially; it was their lowest charting album since their sophomore release 1971's Sweet Replies.

Despite the dismissal of both the group and their final album at the time, the legacy of Honey Cone was reaffirmed when Kanye West sampled the distinctive lead vocals of Edna Wright from the track "Innocent 'Til Proven Guilty" for Common's 2005 single "Testify" from his commercial breakthrough album Be. Edna Wright also made a cameo appearance in the video.

This album contains cover versions of The Miracles' staples "Ooo Baby Baby", "Who's Lovin' You", and the 1965 R&B hit "Stay in My Corner" by The Dells. The group disbanded shortly after the release of this album.

== Track listing ==
Side one
No.	Title	Writer(s)	Length
1.	"Ooo Baby Baby"	William Robinson, Warren Moore	6:34
2.	"Stay in My Corner"	Wade Flemons, Bobby Miller, Barrett Strong	4:57
3.	"Who's Lovin' You"	William Robinson	4:00
4.	"A Woman's Prayer"	General Johnson, Greg Perry	3:29

Side two
No.	Title	Writer(s)	Length
5.	"Sittin' on a Time Bomb (Waitin' for the Hurt to Come)"	General Johnson, Greg Perry	3:39
6.	"Innocent 'Til Proven Guilty"	General Johnson, Greg Perry, Angelo Bond	3:27
7.	"I Lost My Rainbow"	Angelo Bond, General Johnson, Greg Perry	3:40
8.	"Ace in the Hole"	General Johnson, Greg Perry, Angelo Bond	3:03
9.	"Woman Can't Live by Bread Alone"	Angelo Bond, General Johnson, Greg Perry	2:57
10.	"Don't Sent Me an Invitation"	Angelo Bond, General Johnson, Greg Perry	2:59

== Personnel ==
Honey Cone

- Carolyn Willis
- Edna Wright
- Shelly Clark

Technical

- Barney Perkins, Ed Redd - engineer
- Ron Dunbar - executive producer
