= Want ad =

Want ad may refer to:

- Want Ads, a song by Honey Cone
- Classified advertising
- Internet bulletin board
- Personal advertisement
