= One Monkey Don't Stop No Show =

One Monkey Don't Stop No Show may refer to:

Songs:

- "One Monkey Don't Stop No Show", a 1950 R&B song by Stick McGhee and His Buddies
- "One Monkey Don't Stop No Show", a 1965 R&B song by Joe Tex
- "One Monkey Don't Stop No Show (Part I)", a 1971 R&B song by Honey Cone
- "One Monkey Don't Stop No Show", a 1975 Country song by Little David Wilkins

Other Media:

- One Monkey Don't Stop No Show (play), a 1982 play by Don Evans
- One Monkey Don't Stop No Show (album), an album by Goodie Mob
