= As Long as I Got You =

As Long as I Got You may refer to:

- "As Long as I Got You" (Lily Allen song) 2014
- "As Long as I Got You" (Laura Lee song) 1968
- "As Long as I Got You", a 2010 song by Dave Lee
