= Stickup (disambiguation) =

Stickup is a robbery at gunpoint.

Stick-Up may also refer to:

- "Stick-Up", a song by Honey Cone
- Stick-Up!, an album by Bobby Hutcherson
