= Dave Rowberry =

Musical artist (1940-2003)

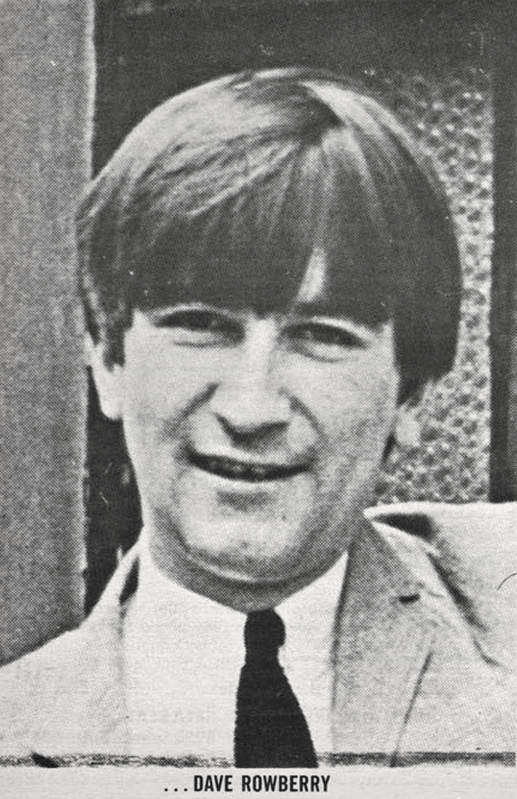
- Rowberry in February 19, 1966 issue of KRLA Beat

Background information
- Also known as: Davey Boy Rowberry
- Born: David Eric Rowberry; 4 July 1940; Mapperley, Nottinghamshire, England
- Died: 6 June 2003 (aged 62) London Borough of Hackney, England
- Genres: Rock and roll, R&B, jazz
- Occupations: Musician, songwriter
- Instruments: Keyboards; Vocals
- Years active: 1960s–2003
- Label: Mouse Records
- Formerly of: The Animals

David Eric Rowberry (4 July 1940 – 6 June 2003) was an English pianist and organist, most known for being a member of the rock and R&B group the Animals in the 1960s.

== Early career, 1962–1965 ==
Born in Mapperley, Nottinghamshire, Rowberry entered the Newcastle-upon-Tyne blues and jazz music scene in the early 1960s, when he was at Newcastle University. He joined the Mike Cotton Jazzmen (later the Mike Cotton Sound) in 1962, who made a living backing American blues and pop acts touring England, including Solomon Burke, Stevie Wonder, the Four Tops and Gene Pitney. Rowberry played on the group's singles from 1962 to 1965, including their hit, "Swing That Hammer", as well as their self-titled album.

== The Animals, 1965–1966 ==
The Animals were already one of the major British Invasion groups in May 1965 when founding keyboardist Alan Price suddenly left due to fear of flying and other issues. According to lead singer Eric Burdon, Rowberry, while considered a good musician, was chosen partly because of his passing physical resemblance to Price. Keyboardist Zoot Money, who became a full-time member of a later configuration of the band, claims that he was approached first, and Rowberry only selected as a second choice.

Rowberry played many of the group's big hits, including "We Gotta Get Out of This Place", "It's My Life", "Don't Bring Me Down", "Inside-Looking Out", and "See See Rider". For a number of songs, including the last of these, Rowberry was credited as the arranger. He also played on the hit single "Help Me Girl". He was prominent on Animalisms and Animalization, often considered two of the most consistent albums of the group's recording career. He also sang backing vocals and did occasional songwriting for the group.

== After the Animals, 1966–1999 ==
The original incarnation of the Animals collapsed in September 1966, after which Rowberry became a session musician. Until 2001, he was not invited to participate in any subsequent group reunions involving Eric Burdon. He did reunite a few times on projects with his former bandmates from the Mike Cotton Sound. The most notable reunion was the Kinks' album, Everybody's in Show-Biz. Rowberry played on the single "Celluloid Heroes" and some keyboard instruments on the album. He also appeared with the Kinks on television during this time on the song, "Supersonic Rocket Ship". Rowberry also played on many albums by blues singer Dana Gillespie in the 1980s and 1990s.

When the first incarnation Animals reformed in December 1968 and 1976, Rowberry was excluded, in favour of Price. When a second keyboardist was added to the original group's third reunion in 1983 to early 1984, it was Zoot Money, rather than Rowberry, who was chosen. When the Animals were inducted into the Rock and Roll Hall of Fame in 1994, only the original five members were honoured. Despite attempts by some fans to have Rowberry, as well as drummer Barry Jenkins, another later member of the "first" lineup, inducted with the other members, their efforts were unsuccessful. Rowberry was present at the May 2001 reunion concert on Burdon's birthday, along with John Steel and Hilton Valentine. All had been inducted earlier that day into the Rock Walk of Fame in Los Angeles. Price was not present at the induction, while original bassist Chas Chandler had died in 1996.

In the early to mid-1990s, Rowberry was a member of Shut Up Frank, a band formed by Mick Avory, of The Kinks. The band was composed of Avery, Noel Redding, Dave Clarke, Jim Leverton, keyboardist Richard Simmons and Rowberry. The band toured extensively and recorded ten studio tracks which were released on two EPs. The band also released a live recording from its performance at the Brian Jones Memorial Concert in Cheltenham.

== "New" Animals groups; Animals and Friends, 1999–2003 ==
In 1999, Rowberry joined "Animals II", formed in 1993 by original Animals guitarist Hilton Valentine and also including original Animals drummer John Steel. Other members of this version of the band included Steve Hutchinson, Steve Dawson and Martin Bland. After Rowberry joined the band in 1999, the "Animals II" name was dropped in favor of "The Animals". Following Hilton Valentine's 2001 departure from the band, Steel and Rowberry continued as "Animals and Friends", until Rowberry's 2003 death, accompanied by Peter Barton, Jim Rodford and John Williamson, joined on occasion by ex-"New Animals" bassist Danny McCulloch. During this period Rowberry also worked as a freelance musician in the London jazz scene.

== Death ==
Rowberry died in London on 6 June 2003, at the age of 62.
