= Oops! Here I Go Again =

Studio album by Edna Wright
- Released: 1977
- Recorded: 1976
- Genre: R&B, funk, soul
- Length: 34:26
- Label: RCA Victor
- Producer: Greg Perry

Professional ratings
Review scores
Source	Rating
AllMusic	4.5/5 stars

Oops! Here I Go Again is the debut and only studio album by former Honey Cone vocalist Edna Wright. It was produced by her husband Greg Perry and released on RCA Victor in 1977.

== Track listing ==
1. Oops! Here I Go Again - (Edna Wright, Greg Perry, Billy Smith) 3:57
2. Spend the Nights With Me (Edna Wright, Angelo Bond, Terrance Harrison) 4:06
3. Tomorrow May Never Come - (Edna Wright, Angelo Bond) 3:39
4. Nothing Comes To a Sleeper (But a Dream) - (Edna Wright, Angelo Bond, Terrance Harrison, Greg Perry) 4:10
5. You Can't See the Forest (For the Trees) - (Edna Wright, Angelo Bond) 6:17
6. Come On Down (Get Your Head Out of the Clouds) - (Edna Wright, Angelo Bond) 5:49
7. If the Price is Right - (Edna Wright, Angelo Bond) 6:28

== Personnel ==
- Edna Wright - lead and backing vocals
- Ray Parker Jr., David Pruitt - guitar
- Chuck Boyd - bass
- Sylvester Rivers, William Smith - keyboards
- Larry Tolbert - drums
- Leslie Bass - percussion
- Sidney Barnes, Dennis Perry, Anita Sherman, Ernie Smith - backing vocals
