= Take Me with You =

Studio album by Honey Cone
- Released: April 21, 1970
- Genre: R&B, soul, funk
- Length: 30:08
- Label: Hot Wax; HA-701
- Producer: Holland-Dozier-Holland, Greg Perry

Honey Cone chronology
Take Me with You (1970)	Sweet Replies (1971)

Professional ratings
Review scores
Source	Rating
Allmusic	3.5/5 stars

Take Me with You is the debut studio album by American R&B girl group the Honey Cone. It was released by Hot Wax/Invictus Records in 1970 (see 1970 in music).

== Album information ==
Introducing the world to the unique soulful spunk that was Honey Cone was what "Take Me with You" achieved. Their lead single "While You're Out Looking for Sugar," (released in 1969) sums up both the lyrical and musical approach that made the band so distinctive. The song, among many other's in their catalogue, was about a cheating man and his girlfriend (the protagonist) declaring to him that someone better will steal her from him while he's out "looking for sugar." The song along with album favorites "Girls It Ain't Easy" and "Sunday Morning People" takes on what becomes a familiar scolding tone that a lot of Honey Cone songs carry with titles and lyrics that use old sayings and cliches to convey the feeling of heartbreak or female-empowerment. "Sunday Morning People" addresses hypocritical Christian's who "go to church on Sunday" and "hate your neighbor all week." Like most albums of its time, there are a couple of cover songs present here. Covers include "Aquarius" the 1969 number one hit by The 5th Dimension from the musical Hair and the Dusty Springfield classic "Son of a Preacher Man". Although many songs were officially credited to Ronald Dunbar and Edyth Wayne, the newly departed Motown songwriting team Holland-Dozier-Holland (Eddie Holland, Jr., Lamont Dozier and Brian Holland) was the party behind the Edyth Wayne pseudonym and was responsible for the greater bulk of songs by Honey Cone and other Hot Wax artists.

== Track listing ==
Side one
No.	Title	Writer(s)	Length
1.	"Sunday Morning People"	Ronald Dunbar, Edyth Wayne	2:41
2.	"Son of a Preacher Man"	John D. Hurley, Ronnie S. Wilkins	2:27
3.	"Take Me with You"	Ronald Dunbar, Edyth Wayne	2:58
4.	"Girls It Ain't Easy"	Ronald Dunbar, Edyth Wayne	3:11
5.	"You Made Me So Very Happy"	Berry Gordy, Jr., Frank Wilson, Brenda Holloway, Patrice Holloway	3:16
6.	"Are You Man Enough, Are You Strong Enough?"	Ronald Dunbar, Edyth Wayne	3:15

Side two
No.	Title	Writer(s)	Length
7.	"Aquarius"	James Rado, Gerome Ragni, Galt MacDermot	2:55
8.	"Take My Love"	Greg Perry, Ronald Dunbar	2:52
9.	"While You're Out Looking for Sugar"	Ronald Dunbar, Edyth Wayne	3:13
10.	"My Mind's on Leaving But My Heart Won't Let Me Go"	Ronald Dunbar, Edyth Wayne	2:55
11.	"The Feeling's Gone"	Ronald Dunbar, Edyth Wayne	2:49
