= The Girlfriends =

American girl group of the 1960s

The Girlfriends were an American girl group from Los Angeles who scored one hit in the United States in 1964, "My One and Only Jimmy Boy".

The group was founded as a result of the splintering of the studio group The Blossoms. The four members of the Blossoms — Gloria Jones, Nanette Williams, Fanita James, and Darlene Wright — first sang together in 1957. In 1962, Phil Spector created the group Bob B. Soxx and the Blue Jeans with James and Wright; Jones and Williams then formed their own group, The Girlfriends, with Carolyn Willis (formerly of The Ikettes). They released one single, "My One and Only Jimmy Boy", on Colpix Records in 1963, written and produced by David Gates. "My One and Only Jimmy Boy" used production techniques similar to Phil Spector's. The session for "My One and Only Jimmy Boy" was arranged and paid for by Jan & Dean member Jan Berry. The record peaked at #49 on the Billboard Hot 100 in 1964 and #77 on the Cashbox charts. The Girlfriends never released another record; however, they recorded two more songs for a second single, "Baby Don't Cry" and "I Don't Believe in You", which were never released. Colpix had slated them for issue in early 1964, but according to the group members, the assassination of John F. Kennedy put a damper on record sales and releases, and their second single was shelved in the event's wake. Following the Girlfriends, Willis worked as a session singer for musicians such as Lou Rawls and O.C. Smith, and later joined Honey Cone. Willis was also a featured vocalist on Seals and Crofts 1976 hit, "Get Closer". Both she and Jones sang in one of the nostalgia-circuit groups performing as The Shirelles in the 1990s.
