= Greg Perry (musician) =

American singer-songwriter

- Born: January 23, 1948
- Died: March 13, 2023 (aged 75)
- Genres: Soul
- Occupations: Record producer, musician
- Instruments: Vocals, keyboards
- Labels: Casablanca, RCA

Greg Perry (January 21, 1948 – March 13, 2023) was a singer, songwriter and record producer. He worked with artists such as Freda Payne. He wrote and produced many hits for soul artists in the 1970s. He was also the brother of singer Jeff Perry and was married to Edna Wright, who sang in the group Honey Cone.

== Solo career ==
Perry had four charting singles on the R&B Charts. In 1971, his single "The Boogie Man" got to #81 In 1975, "Come On Down (Get Your Head Out Of The Clouds)" peaked at #24, and "I'll Be Comin' Back" made it to #48. In 1982, "It Takes Heart" peaked at #53.

== Song writing and production ==
=== 1970s ===
He produced songs for Chairmen of the Board that would end up on their Give Me Just A Little More Time + In Session ... Plus album. Along with General Johnson and Angelo Bond, he produced and co-wrote "Bring The Boys Home" for Freda Payne. He was also the producer and co-writer for "Want Ads for the group Honey Cone. He produced the album Oops! Here I Go Again for his wife, former Honey Cone member Edna Wright which was released in 1977 on RCA.

=== 1980s ===
In addition to producing the album In And Out Of Love for Mary Wells, he wrote and co-wrote five songs for the album, played keyboards and contributed to background vocals. His brother Zachary Perry and wife Edna Wright were also involved with the album. He co-wrote and co-produced "Under The Influence Of Love", also written by Wright, and "If The Price Is Right" which appeared on the Bonnie Pointer album If the Price is Right which was released in 1984.

== Solo discography ==
Singles
Title	Release info	Year	Notes
"Love Control" / "Head Over Heels (In Love)"	Chess 2032	1967	
"The Boogie Man Part I" / "The Boogie Man Part II"	Casablanca NEB 0019	1974	
"Come On Down (Get Your Head Out Of The Clouds)" / "Variety Is The Spice Of Life"	Casablanca NB 817	1975	
"I'll Be Comin' Back" / "Love Is Magic"	Casablanca NB 835	1975	
"Where There's Smoke (There's Fire)" / "(I Can See The) Handwriting On The Wall"	RCA PB-11081	1977	
"Come Fly With Me" / "Let's Get Away From It All"	RCA PB-11172	1977	
"It Takes Heart" / "The Getaway"	Alfa ALF-7016	1982	
