= Animalisms =

Studio album by the Animals
- Released: 13 May 1966
- Recorded: 9–10 January 1966
- Genre: R&B
- Length: 36:45
- Label: Decca
- Producer: Tom Wilson

The Animals UK chronology
The Most of the Animals (1966)	Animalisms (1966)	Winds of Change (1967)

Professional ratings
Review scores
Source	Rating
AllMusic	4.5/5 stars
Encyclopedia of Popular Music	3/5 stars

Animalisms is the third studio album by the English R&B/blues rock band the Animals, and was released in the United Kingdom in May 1966 on Decca Records. It was the first Animals album to be produced by Tom Wilson as well as the first to feature keyboardist Dave Rowberry after the May 1965 departure of original keyboardist Alan Price. It reached number four on the Record Retailer Albums Chart and remained there for 17 weeks.

== Track listing ==
Side one
No.	Title	Writer(s)	Length
1.	"One Monkey Don't Stop No Show"	Joe Tex	3:18
2.	"Maudie"	John Lee Hooker	4:01
3.	"Outcast"	Eddie Campbell, Ernie Johnson Jnr.	3:02
4.	"Sweet Little Sixteen"	Chuck Berry	3:05
5.	"You're on My Mind"	Eric Burdon, Dave Rowberry	2:52
6.	"Clapping"	Rowberry	1:18

Side two
No.	Title	Writer(s)	Length
7.	"Gin House Blues"	Harry Burke (aka J. C. Johnson)	4:36
8.	"Squeeze Her, Tease Her"	Alonzo Tucker, Jackie Wilson	2:57
9.	"What Am I Living For"	Fred Jay, Art Harris	3:11
10.	"I Put a Spell on You"	Screamin' Jay Hawkins	2:54
11.	"That's All I Am to You"	Winfield Scott, Otis Blackwell	2:22
12.	"She'll Return It"	Rowberry, Burdon	2:40

1999 CD reissue bonus tracks
No.	Title	Writer(s)	Length
13.	"Inside-Looking Out"	Burdon, John Lomax, Alan Lomax, Chas Chandler	3:43
14.	"Don't Bring Me Down"	Gerry Goffin, Carole King	3:15
15.	"Cheating"	Chandler, Burdon	2:22
16.	"Help Me Girl"	Scott English, Larry Weiss	2:33
17.	"See See Rider"	Traditional; arranged by Rowberry	3:59
18.	"I Just Want to Make Love to You" (In the Beginning There Was Early Animals EP)	Willie Dixon	3:44
19.	"Boom Boom" (In the Beginning There Was Early Animals EP)	Hooker	3:47
20.	"Big Boss Man" (In the Beginning There Was Early Animals EP)	Al Smith, Luther Dixon	3:43
21.	"Pretty Thing" (In the Beginning There Was Early Animals EP)	Dixon	2:36
22.	"Don't Bring Me Down" (Stereo version)		3:14
23.	"See See Rider" (Stereo version)		4:00
24.	"Help Me Girl" (Stereo version)		2:39
25.	"Cheating" (Stereo version)		2:21

== Personnel ==
The Animals

- Eric Burdon – lead vocals
- Hilton Valentine – guitar, vocals
- Dave Rowberry – keyboards, vocals
- Chas Chandler – bass, vocals
- John Steel – drums, except as noted below
- Barry Jenkins – drums on "Don't Bring Me Down", "Cheating" and "See See Rider"

Technical

- Tom Wilson – producer

== Charts ==
Chart (1966)	Peak position
Finnish Mitä Suomi Soittaa LPs Chart	7
UK Disc and Music Echo Top Ten LPs in Britain	5
UK Melody Maker Top Ten LPs	5
UK New Musical Express Best Selling LPs in Britain	4
UK Record Retailer LPs Chart	4
