= Soulful Tapestry =

Studio album by Honey Cone
- Released: December 1971
- Genre: R&B/Soul/Funk
- Length: 42:09
- Label: Hot Wax; HA-707
- Producer: Angelo Bond, Ronald Dunbar, Lamont Dozier, Brian Holland, Edward Holland, Jr., General Norman Johnson, Greg Perry, and Edith Wayne.

Honey Cone chronology
Sweet Replies (1971)	Soulful Tapestry (1971)	Love, Peace & Soul (1972)

Professional ratings
Review scores
Source	Rating
Allmusic	4.5/5 stars
Christgau's Record Guide	B−

Soulful Tapestry is the third studio album by girl group Honey Cone. It was released by Hot Wax/Invictus Records in 1971 (see 1971 in music).

== Album information ==
The name of the album was based on and inspired by Carole King's Pop/Rock break-through 1971 album Tapestry. The album contained the group's four highest charting singles including; the funky soul upbeat number "Want Ads" - In the vein of The Jackson 5's "I Want You Back," this single became the group's highest charting single and biggest single of their career hitting number one in June, 1971; "Stick-Up" - a similar follow up to "Want Ads," the song peaked at number eleven in the US in August, 1971; and "One Monkey Don't Stop No Show (Pt. 1)" - a Latin flavoured slam at a lover gone cold with similar chord progressions akin to The Isley Brothers' 1962 hit "Twist & Shout", a number fifteen hit in November, 1971, and "The Day I Found Myself", a number 23 hit in April 1972.

Lyrically, the material was quietly instrumental in developing the message of female empowerment through song. With the aggressive funk music fronted by lead singer, Edna Wright's gospel growl, and lyrics centered on love abandoned and love found, female commentary on modern relationships was becoming less out-of-place. Other notable moments on the album include "One Monkey Don't Stop No Show (Pt. 2)" - an instrumental to the first part, the gospel-inspired "Who's It Gonna Be?," the gritty ballad "All The King's Men," and the funky bass-driven piano ballad "The Day I Found Myself."

Though out of print, like the group's other releases, all of the tracks on this album are featured on Honey Cone's Soulful Sugar: The Complete Hot Wax Recordings (2001, Castle Music UK). This album was also issued on CD by the Japanese label P-Vine (PCD-4958).

== Track listing ==
Side one
No.	Title	Writer(s)	Length
1.	"One Monkey Don't Stop No Show-Part I"	General Johnson, Greg Perry	3:43
2.	"One Monkey Don't Stop No Show-Part II"	General Johnson, Greg Perry	4:16
3.	"Don't Count Your Chickens (Before They Hatch)"	General Johnson, Greg Perry, Angelo Bond	3:01
4.	"A Little More"	Ronald Dunbar, Edyth Wayne	3:21
5.	"Stick-Up"	General Johnson, Angelo Bond, Greg Perry	3:02
6.	"Want Ads"	General Johnson, Barney Perkins, Greg Perry	3:45

Side two
No.	Title	Writer(s)	Length
7.	"Who's It Gonna Be"	Holland–Dozier–Holland	5:52
8.	"How Does It Feel"	Brian Holland, Lamont Dozier, Ronald Dunbar, Edyth Wayne	3:09
9.	"V.I.P."	Greg Perry, General Johnson, Angelo Bond	3:46
10.	"The Day I Found Myself"	Ronald Dunbar, Edyth Wayne, General Johnson	4:21
11.	"All the King's Horses (All the King's Men)"	Angelo Bond, General Johnson, Greg Perry	3:41

== Production ==
- Producer: Angelo Bond, Ronald Dunbar, Lamont Dozier, Brian Holland, Edward Holland, Jr., General Norman Johnson, Greg Perry, and Edith Wayne.
- Arranger: Angelo Bond, General Norman Johnson, and Greg Perry.
- Engineer: Barney Perkins
