= Spirits (band) =

English music group

Spirits is a male/female dance music duo from England, who scored two entries on the US Billboard Hot Dance Music/Club Play chart in 1995. Members are Osmond Wright and Beverly Thomas. Their debut single, "Don't Bring Me Down" (1994), spent two weeks at number one on the dance chart and it was followed by "Spirit Inside" (1995), which hit number twelve.

== See also ==
- List of number-one dance hits (United States)
- List of artists who reached number one on the US Dance chart
