= Don't Bring Me Down (The Animals song) =

- Scandinavian picture sleeve

Single by the Animals
- B-side: "Cheating"
- Released: May 1966
- Recorded: 13 April 1966
- Length: 3:13
- Label: Decca Records (UK), MGM Records (U.S.)
- Songwriters: Gerry Goffin, Carole King
- Producer: Tom Wilson

The Animals singles chronology
"Inside-Looking Out" (1966)	"Don't Bring Me Down" (1966)	"See See Rider" (1966)

"Don't Bring Me Down" is a song composed by Gerry Goffin and Carole King and recorded as a 1966 hit single by the Animals. It was the group's first release with drummer Barry Jenkins, who replaced founding member John Steel as he had left the band in February of that year.

== History ==
"Don't Bring Me Down" was one of a series of Animals renditions of Brill Building material, following the 1965 hits "We Gotta Get Out of This Place" and "It's My Life". According to one account, all three came out of one call in 1965 that the Animals' then-producer Mickie Most made for songs.

The Animals had always had a somewhat contentious relationship with such songs, knowing they gave them hits but preferring the more straightforward R&B numbers they used for album tracks. Moreover, now they were performing a Goffin and King selection; although the couple was already legendary for their pop songwriting prowess, Animals lead singer Eric Burdon had previously seemingly mocked Goffin-King's "Take Good Care of My Baby" in the Animals' 1964 stream-of-consciousness rock history "Story of Bo Diddley". Furthermore, they were now using Tom Wilson as a producer, who promised them more artistic freedom than they had had under Mickie Most.

The Animals' arrangement is led by a pulsating organ riff from Dave Rowberry, which is then set against a prominent bass guitar line from Chas Chandler. Hilton Valentine decorates the song with fuzz guitar chords. Eric Burdon sings the verses in a quiet manner:

When you complain and criticize
I feel I'm nothing in your eyes
It makes me feel like giving up
Because my best just ain't good enough
Girl, I want to provide for you
And do all the things that you want me to

before sliding into a loud, pleading voice on the chorus:

Oh oh no!
Don't bring me down

No no no no

Oh babe oh no
Don't bring me down

Billboard called the song an "emotional ballad wailer."

Rolling Stone later wrote that "Don't Bring Me Down" represented one side of the Goffin-King "boy-girl, loneliness-togetherness" duality. Allmusic considers "Don't Bring Me Down" an exemplar of the Animals' "brutally soulful inspiration."

== Chart performance ==
"Don't Bring Me Down" was a solid hit, reaching the Top 10 (#6) in the UK pop singles chart, and falling just short of that on the U.S. pop singles chart, reaching number 12 during June and July 1966. It was also popular in Canada, reaching number 3 on the CHUM Chart and number 5 on the RPM Chart. It was also one of their most popular singles in Germany, reaching number 17. On the New Zealand Listener chart, it reached number 19.

== Later versions ==
- New York Dolls singer David Johansen's Animals medley from his 1982 live album Live It Up gained considerable MTV exposure; "Don't Bring Me Down" was in the middle, following "We Gotta Get Out of This Place" and before "It's My Life".
- The Guess Who did this song on the bootleg live album Live in Winnipeg in 1967.
- Tom Petty and the Heartbreakers had "Don't Bring Me Down" in their concert repertoire from 1977 to 1986, and a 1978 performance of it was captured on their 1985 live album Pack up the Plantation: Live!.
- Eric Burdon has performed it with Shaffer, Robby Krieger and Brian Auger, as well as in his own bands of the 1980s, 1990s, and 2000s.
- The song has also been recorded by Riki Maiocchi, Paul Shaffer, and Southside Johnny.

== Similarly titled songs ==
Some websites erroneously claim the song has earlier been recorded by Pretty Things in 1964; in fact, that "Don't Bring Me Down" was a different song, written by Johnny Dee, manager of British band The Fairies, and that was a Top 10 hit in the UK.

There also are two subsequent songs by the same title: the pop hit "Don't Bring Me Down" by Electric Light Orchestra in 1979, and an R&B/dance hit "Don't Bring Me Down" by Spirits in 1995.
