= Laura Lee (singer-songwriter) =

American singer

- Also known as: Laura Lee Rundless
- Born: Laura Lee Newton; March 9, 1945 (age 81); Chicago, Illinois, United States
- Genres: Soul, gospel
- Occupations: Singer, songwriter
- Years active: 1956 – present
- Labels: Ric-Tic, Chess, Cotillion, Hot Wax, Ariola

Laura Lee (born Laura Lee Newton; March 9, 1945 in Chicago, Illinois) is an American soul and gospel singer and songwriter, most successful in the 1960s and 1970s and influential for her records which discussed and celebrated women's experience.

== Career ==
Lee was born in Chicago, but as a child moved to Detroit with her mother, Helen Bethel. The founder of a leading gospel group, Ernestine Rundless of The Meditation Singers, was a trusted mentor. Featuring Della Reese, they were the first Detroit gospel group to perform with instrumental backing. The group recorded on the Specialty label in the mid-1950s, appeared on the LP Della Reese Presents The Meditation Singers in 1958, and in the early 1960s recorded for Checker Records.

As Laura Lee Rundless, she replaced Reese in The Meditation Singers in 1956, and over the next few years toured widely around the country. In 1965, as Laura Lee, she launched her secular solo career as an R&B singer in clubs in Detroit, although she also continued to record occasionally with The Meditation Singers. She first recorded solo for Ric-Tic Records in 1966, with "To Win Your Heart".

Around this time, she recorded an interesting uptempo adaption of an unreleased Little Richard song, "You'd Better Stop", re-titled "Stop Giving Your Man Away". A typically "mature" philosophical side by Laura.

The following year, she signed with Chess Records and, after initially recording in-house with the label's producers in Chicago, it was decided to send her to Rick Hall's FAME Studios in Muscle Shoals to record "Dirty Man". This became her first hit, reaching No. 13 R&B and No. 68 pop. She stayed with Chess until 1969, also recording "Up Tight, Good Man" (No. 16 R&B) and "As Long As I Got You" (No. 31 R&B).

A short spell with Atlantic subsidiary, Cotillion, resulted in two singles and then in 1970, Lee moved to former Motown producers, Holland, Dozier and Holland's newly established Hot Wax label in Detroit. One of her first recordings for Hot Wax, "Women's Love Rights", became one of her biggest hits, reaching No. 11 on the R&B chart in 1971 and No. 36 pop. In 1972, "Rip Off" became her biggest R&B hit at No. 3 but only climbed to No. 68 on the Billboard Hot 100. She also recorded an album, Two Sides of Laura Lee, while in a relationship with singer Al Green. Most of her material on Hot Wax was produced by William Weatherspoon, formerly with Motown.

"Millie Jackson is touted as 'Lady Funk', but as of now she hasn't come up with an album nearly as satisfying as this unorthodox compilation, constructed on short notice from just two LPs, the second of which never charted. Lee's voice isn't as big as Jackson's, but she's got comparable breadth emotionally and timbrally as well as stronger material. Hard-assed on one side, winsome on the other, and let's hope she doesn't fall through the cracks."

— The Best of Laura Lee review in Christgau's Record Guide: Rock Albums of the Seventies (1981)

Lee left Invictus / Hot Wax in 1975 and signed with Ariola Records, but became seriously ill shortly afterward and retired from the music industry for several years. She returned in 1983 with a gospel album, Jesus Is The Light Of My Life, on which she worked with Al Green. By 1990 she recovered from her illness and had been ordained as a minister. She has continued recording music, mostly gospel.

A Swedish garage rock band did an unexpected homage to Lee by baptizing themselves as Division of Laura Lee.

She made an appearance in the 1973 blaxploitation film Detroit 9000, as a singer in the opening scenes.

== Discography ==
=== Albums ===
Year	Title	Label
1971	Women's Love Rights	Hot Wax
1972	Love More than Pride	Cadet
1972	Two Sides of Laura Lee	Hot Wax
1974	I Can't Make it Alone	Invictus

=== Chart singles ===
Year	Single	Chart Positions	
Year	Single	US Pop	US R&B
1967	"Dirty Man"	68	13
1967	"Wanted: Lover, No Experience Necessary" / "Up Tight, Good Man"	84; 93	– 16
1968	"As Long As I Got You"	123	31
1968	"Need To Belong"	–	44
1969	"Hang It Up"	–	48
1971	"Wedlock Is A Padlock"	–	37
1971	"Women's Love Rights"	36	11
1971	"Love And Liberty"	94	23
1972	"Since I Fell For You"	76	24
1972	"Rip Off"	68	3
1972	"If You Can Beat Me Rockin' (You Can Have My Chair)"	65	31
1972	"Crumbs Off The Table"	–	40
1973	"I'll Catch You When You Fall"	–	49
1974	"I Need It Just As Bad As You"	–	55
1976	"Love's Got Me Tired (But I Ain't Tired Of Love)"	–	61
