= Sweet Mary =

Single by Wadsworth Mansion

from the album Wadsworth Mansion
- B-side: "What's on Tonight"
- Released: October 1970
- Genre: Pop rock
- Length: 2:40
- Label: Sussex
- Songwriter: Steve Jablecki
- Producers: Jim Calvert, Norman Marzano

Wadsworth Mansion singles chronology
"Sweet Mary" (1970)	"Michigan Harry Slaughter" (1971)

"Sweet Mary" is a song written by Steve Jablecki and performed by Wadsworth Mansion. "Sweet Mary" was featured on their 1971 album Wadsworth Mansion and was produced by Jim Calvert and Norman Marzano.

== Chart performance ==
"Sweet Mary" reached #7 on the U.S. pop chart and #35 on the U.S. adult contemporary chart in 1971. In Canada, the song reached #5.

It ranked #96 on Billboard magazine's Top 100 singles of 1971.

== Chart history ==
=== Weekly charts ===
Chart (1970–71)	Peak position
Australia (Kent Music Report)	84
Canada RPM Top Singles	5
U.S. Billboard Hot 100	7
U.S. Billboard Easy Listening	35
U.S. Cash Box Top 100	5

=== Year-end charts ===
Chart (1971)	Rank
U.S. Billboard Hot 100	96
U.S. Cash Box	79
