= As Long as I Got You (Laura Lee song) =

Single

"As Long As I Got You" is a 1968 song by Gene Barge & Laura lee, recorded Laura Lee. The song reached #31 on the R&B charts and was covered by the Laurie Allen Revue. The song was said to be based on The Violinaires' gospel hit "I Don't Know", written by Gene Barge, also in 1968.
