= Sweet Replies =

Studio album by Honey Cone
- Released: June 1971
- Genre: R&B, soul, funk
- Length: 36:04
- Label: Hot Wax; HA-706
- Producer: Ronald Dunbar, George Perry, William Weatherspoon.

Honey Cone chronology
Take Me with You (1970)	Sweet Replies (1971)	Soulful Tapestry (1971)

Singles from Soulful Tapestry
- 1. "Want Ads" Released: March 1971

Professional ratings
Review scores
Source	Rating
Allmusic	4/5 stars
Christgau's Record Guide	B+

Sweet Replies is the second studio album by American R&B/Soul/Funk Girl group the Honey Cone. It was released by Hot Wax/Invictus Records in 1971 (see 1971 in music).

== Album information ==
Although the album was no major commercial success, it contained two songs that would later become hits within a year after the release of Sweet Replies. The number one smash "Want Ads" makes its first appearance on this album (it later appears on the follow-up to Sweet Replies, Soulful Tapestry along with "The Day I Found Myself" (a top 30 hit in 1972).

When this album was released, it was a moderate success, but with the release and eventual success of "Want Ads," as with many releases during this time, a new album was released featuring an extended mix of the track along with a longer version of "The Day I Found Myself." Soulful Tapestry would outsell Sweet Replies with the clever use of such strategic marketing.

Highlights on the album include; "Are You Man Enough, Are You Strong Enough" - a song where the female protagonist asks her man if he's willing to raise the child of another man, "The Day I Found Myself" - is, in classic Honey Cone fashion, a kiss off to an unappreciative man. The song tells the story of a woman who found herself after leaving him. "Are You Man Enough, Are You Strong Enough" makes its second appearance on this album as it was previously included in the previous year's release Take Me with You.

All of the songs from Sweet Replies can be found on Honey Cone's Soulful Sugar: The Complete Hot Wax Recordings (2001, Castle Music UK).

Reviews for Sweet Replies have been positive. Village Voice critic Robert Christgau said "most of this is pure Vandellas." He also stated that the producer "uses every H-D-H [Holland-Dozier-Holland] trick and comes up with a few electronic effects of his own". In a retrospective review, Andrew Hamilton of Allmusic stated that ""Want Ads" propels this twelve-song assortment". He called "The Day I Found Myself" a "beautiful piano-driven declaration".

== Track listing ==
Side one
No.	Title	Writer(s)	Length
1.	"Want Ads"	General Johnson, Greg Perry, Barney Perkins	2:45
2.	"You Made Me Come to You"	William Weatherspoon, Raynard Miner	2:25
3.	"Blessed Be Our Love"	General Johnson, Greg Perry	2:56
4.	"Are You Man Enough, Are You Strong Enough"	Ronald Dunbar, Edyth Wayne	3:15
5.	"When Will It End"	Ronald Dunbar, Edyth Wayne	2:52
6.	"The Feeling's Gone"	Ronald Dunbar, Edyth Wayne	2:51

Side two
No.	Title	Writer(s)	Length
7.	"Sunday Morning People"	Ronald Dunbar, Edyth Wayne	2:40
8.	"Deaf, Blind, Paralyzed"	William Weatherspoon, Raynard Miner	3:03
9.	"Take Me with You"	Ronald Dunbar, Edyth Wayne	2:59
10.	"My Mind's on Leaving, But My Heart Won't Let Me Go"	Ronald Dunbar, Edyth Wayne, General Johnson	2:56
11.	"We Belong Together"	General Johnson, Greg Perry, Ronald Dunbar	3:09
12.	"The Day I Found Myself"	Ronald Dunbar, Edyth Wayne	3:13

== Personnel ==
- Honey Cone - lead and backing vocals
- Robbie Dunbar - piano
- Gary "Gazza" Johnson - bass, guitar
- Reynard Miner
- Eddie Wayne

=== Production ===
- Producer: Ronald Dunbar, George Perry and William Weatherspoon.
- Engineer: Barney Perkins
