= Jim Clash =

American author and participatory journalist

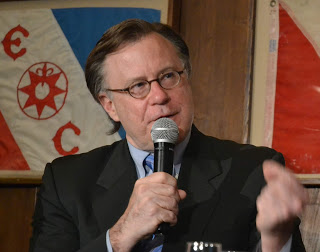
- Clash speaking at The Explorers Club
- Born: James Michael Clash; 1950s Tokyo, Japan
- Education: BA English University of Maryland, MBA from Columbia University
- Occupations: Participatory adventure journalist, Author
- Notable work: Forbes To The Limits, The Right Stuff: Interviews with Icons of the 1960s, The Right Stuff: Interviews with Icons of the 1970s and 1980s

James Michael Clash (born 1950s) is an American participatory adventure journalist and writer who has engaged in and written about various challenging exploits. He has written for Forbes, AskMen, Huffington Post, Bloomberg Businessweek, and Automobile. Clash has written three books: Forbes To The Limits, The Right Stuff: Interviews with Icons of the 1960s, and The Right Stuff: Interviews with Icons of the 1970s and 1980s. He is a fellow and former board member of The Explorers Club and is also ticket holder 610 on Virgin Galactic for a flight to space.

== Early life ==
Clash was born in Tokyo, Japan in the 1950s and raised in Laurel, Maryland. He has a Bachelor of Arts degree in English from the University of Maryland, and an MBA from Columbia University. His first foray into adventure began as an amateur "ham" radio operator. Prior to becoming an adventure journalist, Clash covered mutual funds and finance for Forbes magazine, and was an account director in the advertising industry.

== Interviews with iconic figures ==
As an adventure journalist, Clash has interviewed 8 of the 12 moon walkers including Neil Armstrong and Buzz Aldrin. He has also interviewed legendary aviation pioneers including Chuck Yeager, Senator John Glenn, Sir Richard Branson, Elon Musk, Jeff Bezos, Alan Eustace, Bertrand Piccard, Joe Kittinger, and Felix Baumgartner. Notable mountaineers include Sir Edmund Hillary, Reinhold Messner, Sir Chris Bonington, Jamling Tenzing Norgay, and Jim Whittaker.

Clash has also interviewed deep ocean explorers Don Walsh and James Cameron as well as notable race car drivers Sir Jackie Stewart and Mario Andretti and famous musicians Roger Daltrey, Pete Townshend, Grace Slick, Ginger Baker, and Art Garfunkel. Additional diversity among his interviews includes those of Sir Roger Bannister, Dr. Edward Teller, Joe Frazier, Mikhail Baryshnikov, and Neil de Grasse Tyson.
