= One Monkey Don't Stop No Show (song) =

Title of several different songs

"One Monkey Don't Stop No Show" is the title of several different songs, mostly in the R&B genre, deriving from a common African-American phrase with the general meaning of "one setback should not impede progress". The first known recording with this title was by Stick McGhee and His Buddies in 1950. Commercially successful songs with this title were recorded by Joe Tex (1965), Honey Cone (1971) and Little David Wilkins (1975).

== Stick McGhee song ==
"One Monkey Don't Stop No Show" was recorded by Stick McGhee and His Buddies in 1950. The song was written by McGhee, and released on an Atlantic Records 78, A937, in 1951.

== Big Maybelle song ==
Big Maybelle recorded another song with the same title in 1955. It was issued as the B-side of her original version of "Whole Lotta Shakin' Goin' On". It was written by Charlie Singleton and Rose Marie McCoy. A version was recorded by Bette Midler on her 1998 album Bathhouse Betty.

== Joe Tex song ==
A different same-titled song was both written and recorded by Joe Tex in 1965, and reached No. 20 in the US Billboard R&B chart. In 1966, it was covered by The Animals on their UK album Animalisms and its US counterpart, Animalization. They also performed it on BBC Radio and on several live shows. A cover version of the Joe Tex song was also recorded by Terry Knight and the Pack in 1967.

== Honey Cone song ==
In 1971, the all-girl group Honey Cone took a song with the same title to No. 5 on the Billboard R&B chart and No. 15 on the Billboard Hot 100. It also charted in Australia and Canada. This was written by General Johnson and Greg Perry. It appeared on the group's Soulful Tapestry album (Hot Wax HA-707).

== Little David Wilkins song ==
Another song with the same title was recorded by Little David Wilkins for MCA in 1975, reaching No. 11 on US Billboard Hot Country Songs and No. 48 on CAN RPM Country Playlist. This one was written by Wilkins and Tim Marshall.

== Other songs ==
- Hank Ballard and the Midnighters recorded a song with the same title, written by Sonny Thompson, in 1964.
- David Allan Coe recorded "One Monkey" with the whole saying being quoted in 1982, on the Underground Album.
- Jessie Rogers recorded another same-titled tune, written by Al Johnson and Richard Cobb, in 1983.
- Gillian Welch recorded "One Monkey", written by Welch and David Rawlings, on their 2003 album, Soul Journey.
- Goodie Mob recorded a track "One Monkey Don't Stop No Show" as the title track of their 2004 album.
- Earthgang recorded "Meditate" that referenced the saying in the third verse of the song.
- Bobby Rush had a title track on his 1995 album One Monkey Don't Stop No Show and wrote and recorded an "answer" song called "One Monkey Can Stop A Show" on his 2023 album All My Love For You.
