= Oh Woman, Oh Why =

- Cover of the Italian single release

Single by Paul McCartney
- A-side: "Another Day"
- Released: 19 February 1971
- Recorded: November 1970 – January 1971
- Studio: Columbia Studio B and A&R (New York City)
- Genre: Blues rock
- Length: 4:32
- Label: Apple
- Songwriter: Paul McCartney
- Producers: Paul McCartney; Linda McCartney

Paul McCartney singles chronology
"Another Day" / "Oh Woman, Oh Why" (1971)	"Uncle Albert/Admiral Halsey" (1971)

"Oh Woman, Oh Why" is a song by the English musician Paul McCartney. It was originally released in February 1971 on the Apple Records label as the B-side of his debut single as a solo artist, "Another Day". Written by McCartney following instances of fan harassment while out in New York City, the song was recorded between November 1970 and January 1971 during the sessions for the album Ram. The song has been characterised as a blues rock song with a tough drum sound and a gritty, raw vocal performance. The lyrics detail a woman confronting her unfaithful husband with a gun.

As the B-side of "Another Day", "Oh Woman, Oh Why" peaked at number 5 on the Billboard Hot 100 in April 1971. While it was not originally included on Ram, the song has been included on the special and deluxe editions of the album in 2012. It was also included on The 7" Singles Box in 2022.

== Writing and recording ==
Paul McCartney wrote "Oh Woman, Oh Why" following instances of fan harassment while he and his family were staying in New York City. Sightings of the McCartneys were posted in fanzines and news publications such as Disc and Music Echo, NME, Melody Maker and Billboard, leading to fans showing up outside restaurants and recording studios to see them. Linda McCartney recalled: "Twenty kids would follow us wherever we went. Everywhere—hotel, restaurant, studio. After a while, I asked them to lay off, and one of them turned and said, 'Well what the hell did you expect?' I hadn't expected that." Wanting to capture his growing frustrations with fans, McCartney wrote "Oh Woman, Oh Why" during a voyage from Le Havre back to New York, envisioning the song as a "gritty rocker".

"Oh Woman, Oh Why" was recorded during the sessions for Ram at Columbia Studio B in New York City from 2–3 November 1970. On 2 November, McCartney worked on the arrangement with the guitarist Hugh McCracken and the drummer Denny Seiwell, with numerous improvisations, recording it properly the next day. The basic track was recorded first, followed by overdubs. Both McCartney and McCracken played electric guitar, with the former contributing a straightforward part, and the latter playing a slide guitar part partly adopted from the Mick Jagger song "Memo from Turner", from Jagger's 1970 film Performance. (Note: Kozinn and Sinclair believe this was not a coincidence, as the "Memo from Turner" single had been released 11 days earlier on 23 October and was receiving "ample airplay" on New York FM stations.) McCartney and McCracken subsequently doubled their guitar parts while Seiwell added shaker and cowbell. Overdubbing sessions for McCartney's lead vocal took place from 6–11 December 1970, using the same grit utilised for "Monkberry Moon Delight".

After choosing "Oh Woman, Oh Why" to be the B-side of the "Another Day" single, further overdubbing sessions took place on 26 January 1971 at A&R Recording Studios in New York City. McCartney finished up his lead vocal and added Linda's backing vocals, which were "bounced down and heavily compressed". The following day, McCartney decided to record gunshots using a starting pistol and blanks to reinforce the "where'd you get that gun?" line. The gunshots were recorded after hours to avoid raising the alarms at A&R. McCartney and the engineer Dixon Van Winkle attempted to record them in A&R Studio A-1, but its 30-foot high ceiling proved too reverberant. Van Winkle said: "We practised a lot so that it wouldn't distort. We tried it in different spots, and with different mics." During rehearsals, Paul was photographed by Linda holding the gun with his eyes closed. To avoid distortion, the final overdub of seven shots was recorded in the hallway outside Studio A-2 using a Shure SM57 microphone. "Oh Woman, Oh Why" was mixed at A&R on 5 February 1971.

== Music and lyrics ==
The overall style of "Oh Woman, Oh Why" is that of a tense, blues rock song complemented by a fierce vocal delivery. In addition, the song is paced by a drum rhythm which establishes a solid foundation upon which tight guitar lines interweave. The authors Allan Kozinn and Adrian Sinclair note the song's "tough" drum sound, which Seiwell himself described as "killer". Seiwell covered the drum heads with tea towels to achieve the "dry" sound. Beatle biographer John Blaney praised McCartney's "rip-roaring" vocal performance for its grit and rawness; Luca Perasi compared it to Led Zeppelin's Robert Plant. Blaney also praises McCartney's "economical" bass line and Denny Seiwell's "thunderous" drumming. The author Andrew Grant Jackson compares the slide guitar part to the country blues of Led Zeppelin's "Bron-Y-Aur Stomp" and "Hats Off to (Roy) Harper". Jackson summarised the song as "'Why Don't We Do It in the Road?' with lyrics and a full band backing him."

The song's lyrics concern a jealous woman who murders her unfaithful husband. The woman arrives with a gun to kill him, but he pleads with her to understand what he did wrong. Kozinn and Sinclair note the "obvious" lyrical connections to McCartney's legal troubles with his former Beatles bandmates, naming the lines "I can't get by, 'cos my hands are tied" and "what have I done". Blaney does criticise the lyrics for "questioning rather than celebrating womanhood," stating that in this context the aggressiveness of the vocal performance is "particularly notable". In his book The Lyrics: 1956 to the Present (2021), McCartney compared "Oh Woman, Oh Why" to the folk song "Frankie and Johnny", citing Lead Belly's 1935 version when writing the line "I met her at the bottom of a well".

== Release ==
Apple Records released "Oh Woman, Oh Why" as the B-side of "Another Day" on 19 February 1971 in the United Kingdom and three days later on 22 February in the United States. (Note: 19 February 1971 was the same day Paul and Linda attended London's High Court for the Apple dissolution lawsuit hearing.) It was McCartney's debut single as a solo artist. The single peaked at number 5 on the Billboard Hot 100 in April 1971. According to Perasi, the version that appeared on the radio promo single was mixed in mono. On the Cash Box Top 100 chart, which listed sides separately, "Oh Woman, Oh Why" peaked at number 55. The song has been praised for McCartney's impressive range of vocal pitch. Record World called it "an intense raving side literally packed with dynamite." Jackson describes the song as "the first in a distinguished tradition of great B-sides by McCartney, which have not been consistently available and are thus overlooked." Guitar World's Damian Fanelli positively compared McCartney's lead vocal performance to that of his on the Beatles' song "Oh! Darling" (1969). In 2022, Pitchfork's Jayson Greene said that the song "showcased a hammy Howlin' Wolf impersonation so unrestrained and cartoony that he resembled a furry green Muppet more than any Delta bluesman."

== Subsequent releases ==
Although "Another Day" and "Oh Woman, Oh Why" were not originally released on any solo or Wings album, both songs appeared as bonus tracks on later editions of Ram. "Oh Woman, Oh Why" has also been included on the special and deluxe editions of the 2012 remasters of Ram. It was also included on The 7" Singles Box in 2022.

== Personnel ==
According to Andrew Grant Jackson, except where noted:

- Paul McCartney – vocals, electric guitar, bass, gunshots, producer
- Linda McCartney – backing vocals, producer
- Hugh McCracken – electric guitar
- Denny Seiwell – drums, shaker, cowbell
