= Wadsworth Mansion (band) =

1970s American rock band

- Origin: Providence, Rhode Island, United States
- Genres: Rock music
- Years active: Early 1970s
- Label: Sussex
- Past members: Steve Jablecki; Wayne Gagnon; Russ Sevigny (a/k/a Russ Dana); Mike Jablecki; John Poole

Wadsworth Mansion (also known as Wadsworth Family Mansion) was an early-1970s American rock band from Providence, Rhode Island, United States.

== Background ==
Its members were Steve Jablecki (guitar, keyboards, vocals), Wayne Gagnon (guitar, vocals), Russ Sevigny (a/k/a Russ Dana, original drummer), Mike Jablecki (drums) and John Poole (bass guitar). The group took its name from Wadsworth Mansion at Long Hill in Connecticut.

== Career ==
In November 1970, Wadsworth Mansion released their first single, a non-album version of "Sweet Mary", backed by another non-album track, "What's On Tonight". "Sweet Mary" would prove to be the band's only hit song, peaking at No. 7 on the US Billboard Hot 100 singles chart for the week ending 27 February 1971. It peaked at No. 5 on Cash Box. It also reached No. 35 on the Easy Listening chart.

In April 1971, Wadsworth Mansion issued their first and only album on the heels of their first single's success, the self-titled Wadsworth Mansion. In support of the album, the group released their second single in April 1971 with the tracks, "Michigan Harry Slaughter" and "Havin' Such A Good Time", but the single failed to make Billboard's Hot 100 chart.

In July 1971, Wadsworth Mansion issued their third and final single with the non-album track, "Nine On The Line", backed by "Queenie Dew". The release would also fail to enter Billboard's Hot 100 singles chart, sealing Wadsworth Mansion's status as a one-hit wonder.

In January 1972, Howie McDonald replaced Wayne Gagnon on guitar. The band recorded four new songs at the CBS studios in New York City. The songs recorded were: "Don't Ask Me," "Over and Over," "Dusty Angel," and "Why Does It Hurt So Bad." These were produced by James Calvert and Norman Marzano. In May 1972, Charlie Flannery replaced Mike Jablecki on drums. This was the line-up of the band until after their last tour of the south in August 1972, when the group officially disbanded.

McDonald and Steve Jablecki reformed the band in Hollywood in the summer of 1973, but changed the name to Slingshot at the producer's urging.

== Select discography ==
=== Singles ===
- 1970: "Sweet Mary"/"What's on Tonight" (Sussex), US Billboard 7
- 1971: "Michigan Harry Slaughter"/"Havin' Such a Good Time" (Sussex), US Cashbox 99
- 1971: "Nine on the Line"/"Queenie Dew" (Sussex)

=== Albums ===
- 1971: Wadsworth Mansion (Sussex), US Billboard 216

==== Track listing ====
- A1 "Long Haired Brown Eyed Girl"
- A2 "Queenie Dew"
- A3 "City Gardner"
- A4 "She Said She Would"
- A5 "Sweet Mary" (Note: April 1971 album version differs from November 1970 single version)
- B1 "I Like It"
- B2 "Michigan Harry Slaughter"
- B3 "Let It Shine"
- B4 "Goodbye"
- B5 "Havin' Such a Good Time"
