= Honey Cone =

American singing group

- 1972 promotional photo of Honey Cone members Carolyn Willis, Edna Wright, and Shelly Clark

Background information
- Origin: Los Angeles, California, U.S.
- Genres: R&B; soul; disco
- Years active: 1968–1973; 1976; 2014 (Soul Train Cruise); 2023–present
- Label: Hot Wax
- Members: Shelly Clark; Kathy Merrick; Wendy Smith-Brune
- Past members: Edna Wright; Carolyn Willis; Sharon Cash

External videos
- "Here Comes The Rain Again"

Honey Cone is an American R&B and soul girl group. Originally formed by lead singer Edna Wright (sister of Darlene Love) with Carolyn Willis and Shelly Clark in 1968. They are known for their number-one Billboard Hot 100 single, "Want Ads". Honey Cone were the premier female group for Hot Wax Records, operated by Holland–Dozier–Holland after they had departed from Motown Records.

As of 2024, Honey Cone has reunited with founding member Shelly Clark, as well as new members Kathy Merrick and Wendy Smith-Brune.

== Career ==
=== Backgrounds ===
The trio each had previous professional singing experience with various groups and in the studio before forming Honey Cone in 1968.

Edna Wright, a Los Angeles native, grew up singing in the church. Her father, Bishop J.W. Wright, was a pastor at King's Holiness Chapel in Los Angeles. She began her career in a gospel group called The COGIC (Church of God in Christ) singers in 1960. Through her sister, singer Darlene Love, she met producer Phil Spector. Jack Nitzsche, an associate of Spector, produced her first feature recording in 1964. Wright sang lead on "Yes Sir, That's My Baby" by Hale and the Hushabyes which was a pseudonym for a group that included Brian Wilson, Sonny & Cher, Jackie DeShannon. That year she released her debut solo single "A Touch of Venus," which led to a nationwide nightclub tour. Between 1964 and 1967, Wright recorded as Sandy Wynns. She then became a backing vocalist for the Righteous Brothers, Johnny Rivers then for Ray Charles who asked her to join the Raelettes.

Carolyn Willis began singing at the age of 16, she was a member of the girl group the Girlfriends. They released one single, "My One and Only Jimmy Boy" (No. 49 Pop), on Colpix Records in 1963. She also did some session work with Lou Rawls, O.C. Smith, and Bob B. Soxx & the Blue Jeans. Willis and Wright were also members of Darlene Love's group The Blossoms.

Shelly Clark, a native of Brooklyn, began her career at the young age of six. Along with her older brother. they released an album on Columbia Records titled Calypso Songs For Children (1957). At the age of 7, Clark appeared in the hit Broadway musical House of Flowers. Her family moved to Los Angeles in 1957. Her soprano singing earned her a scholarship to attend the University of Southern California. She later became an Ikette in the Ike & Tina Turner Revue, leaving after she was injured in a bus accident in 1966. Clark also was lead dancer on tour with Little Richard and Dusty Springfield. She became a regular singer and dancer on The Jim Nabors Show in 1969.

=== Honey Cone ===
Wright, Willis and Clark first appeared together on an Andy Williams TV special in 1968. Wright's sister Darlene Love was scheduled to appear on the show, but was unable to so she asked Wright to fill in for her. Wright asked Willis and Clark to join her. She also contacted Eddie Holland, who recently left Motown Records along with Brian Holland and Lamont Dozier to form HDH Records, to watch the show.

Impressed by what he saw, Holland signed the trio to Hot Wax Records. Initially, he offered Wright a contract, but she preferred to be in a group. Holland named the act Honey Cone for a favorite flavor of ice cream. At first, group members rejected the name, but Holland prevailed, and the ladies soon embraced its distinctiveness. Although the group was based in Los Angeles, they recorded in Detroit. Most of their songs were written by General Johnson and Wright's boyfriend at the time Greg Perry.

Martha & the Vandellas and The Marvelettes — two of the female vocal groups who represented Motown Records' sound in the 1960s — were among Honey Cone's main influences as the group favored a blend of sweetness and grit in their own sound.

Honey Cone's debut single "While You're Out Looking for Sugar" was also the first single released on Hot Wax. It peaked at No. 26 on Billboard's R&B chart, but the follow-up "Girls, It Ain't Easy," reached No. 8 on the same chart. Their fifth release "Want Ads" proved to be their biggest success, topping both the R&B and pop chart, selling over one million copies, awarded with a gold disc by the R.I.A.A. in May 1971. The trio began headlining their own shows across the US, including at the Apollo Theatre and they performed a series of one-nighters in the South. The same year, Honey Cone had another No. 1 R&B hit and No. 11 pop hit with "Stick-Up," which also sold more than one million units. Honey Cone were named The Best Female Vocal Group by the National Association of Television and Radio Announcers (NATRA) in 1971. Willis' fiancé, promoter Dick Griffey, traveled with them on the road and handled their finances. Further chart success continued in 1972 with "One Monkey Don't Stop No Show" (No. 15 Pop, No. 5 R&B) and "The Day I Found Myself" (No. 23 Pop, No. 8 R&B). However, none of the three of Honey Cone's releases in 1973 sold well. Then, Hot Wax and sister label Invictus Records ran into financial problems reportedly caused by difficulties receiving payments from distributors.

Honey Cone were featured on the cover of Jet on September 2, 1971.

As the vocal arranger for the group, Willis became unhappy with the material they were recording and she left the group in 1973. Honey Cone tried to replace her but the chemistry wasn't coherent so the group split up before 1973 ended. Hot Wax folded soon afterwards under increasing debt.

In 1976, Hot Wax tried to revive the label and released a single by Honey Cone featuring Sharon Cash, with no other original members.

=== Post-Honey Cone careers ===
Wright released a solo album, Oops! Here I Go Again (1977), on RCA. She returned to session work, recording and performing with Annie Lennox, Whitney Houston, Ray Charles, and her sister Darlene Love. In more recent years, Wright performed across the United States with Latari Martin and Melodye Perry, billed as Edna Wright and The Honey Cone. She was married to musician Greg Perry, who co-wrote and produced many of Honey Cone's recordings at Hot Wax, including their two gold records. Wright died on September 12, 2020.

Willis appeared as a featured vocalist on the Seals and Crofts hit "Get Closer," in 1976, and on two tracks from their live album Sudan Village. She recorded jingles for major companies such as Toyota, American Airlines, and Max Factor. Willis recorded and toured with various artists, including Neil Diamond, Boz Scaggs, and Carly Simon.

In 1978, Clark was featured on a syndicated disco music TV series titled Hot City as a character named "Fyre". Clark has been married to Earth, Wind & Fire bassist Verdine White since 1980. She was previously married to Thad Spencer, a Heavyweight boxer and Honey Cone's former bodyguard. She later worked as a production coordinator and casting director for Eddie Murphy Television. She also formed W&W Management Company which represents celebrities.

== Reunions and reformation ==
The original members of Honey Cone attempted a reunion in the 1990s, but Willis backed out of the project after participating in a photoshoot with the group. Willis and Gloria Jones of the Blossoms participated in a recording session with Charles Wright & the Watts 103rd Street Rhythm Band.

In 2003, Wright, Wright's daughter Melodye Perry, and Scherrie Payne of The Supremes performed several shows as Honey Cone.

Wright and Clark-White reunited in February 2014 on the third sailing of the Soul Train Cruise. Combined with Melodye Perry, they presented two concerts that included their hit songs and a cover of Earth, Wind & Fire's, "September", as a tribute to Shelly's marital connection to the band through her husband.

Following Edna Wright's death in 2020, Shelly Clark has continued the legacy of Honey Cone by performing with singers Wendy Smith Brune' and Kathy Merrick. They continue to tour and perform the hits of Honey Cone. In 2022, they were the featured artists at The HAL Awards (Heroes and Legends) in Los Angeles California.

On November 16, 2024, Honey Cone released a new single entitled, "Here Comes The Rain Again", which is a cover of the Eurythmics 1984 hit song. Clark along with new Honey Cone members Kathy Merrick and Wendy Smith-Brune share the lead and background vocals throughout the song. Earth, Wind & Fire's bassist Verdine White along with John Paris (drummer for Earth, Wind & Fire) and Neal H. Pouge are the producers of the remake. The single is Honey Cone's first release in 50 years.

Clark is credited as producer on Earth, Wind & Fire bassist Verdine White's 2024 first solo project entitled, "Superman". A song dedicated to his late brother and founder of Earth, Wind & Fire Maurice White.

=== Awards ===
- RIAA Certification - On May 14, 1971, Honey Cone were awarded a Gold Record for their single "Want Ads" for sales of one million units.
- RIAA Certification - On September 23, 1971, Honey Cone were awarded a Gold Record for their single "Stick Up" for selling a million units.
- On September 18, 2016, Honey Cone were honored with the 2016 National Rhythm and Blues Music Society Unsung Heroine Award at their Black Tie Gala, Dinner & Awards Ceremony at the Double Tree by Hilton in Philadelphia, Pennsylvania. Willis, who was not in attendance received an award as well.
- On September 24, 2017, Clark along with Wright were honored with the Heroes and Legends Award (HAL) in Music as Honey Cone at The Beverly Hill Hotel in Beverly Hills, California.
- On 8, January 2021, Honey Cone was inducted into the Soul Music Hall Of Fame Class of 2020.

== Discography ==
=== Studio albums ===
Year	Album	Peak chart positions			Label
Year	Album	US	US R&B	CAN	Label
1970	Take Me with You	—	—	—	Hot Wax
1970	When Will It End ^{[A]}	—	—	—	Hot Wax
1971	Sweet Replies	137	14	64	Hot Wax
1971	Soulful Tapestry	72	15	—	Hot Wax
1972	Love, Peace & Soul	189	41	—	Hot Wax
"—" denotes a recording that did not chart or was not released in that territory.

- ^{A} Album was never released

=== Compilation albums ===
1984	Girls It Ain't Easy	Holland–Dozier–Holland
1990	Greatest Hits	Holland–Dozier–Holland.
1998	Cone to the Bone: The Best of Honey Cone	Sequel
2001	Soulful Sugar: The Complete Hot Wax Recordings	Castle Music
2002	The Best of Honey Cone	EMI-Capitol

=== Singles ===
Year	Title	Peak chart positions				Certifications	Album
Year	Title	US	US R&B	AUS	CAN	Certifications	Album
1969	"While You're Out Looking for Sugar?"	62	26	—	72		Take Me with You
1969	"Girls It Ain't Easy"	68	8	—	71		Take Me with You
1970	"Take Me with You"	108	28	—	—		Take Me with You / Sweet Replies
1970	"When Will It End"	117	—	—	—		Sweet Replies
1971	"Want Ads"	1	1	—	11	RIAA: Gold	Sweet Replies / Soulful Tapestry
1971	"Stick-Up"	11	1	—	23	RIAA: Gold	Soulful Tapestry
1971	"One Monkey Don't Stop No Show"	15	5	44	14		Soulful Tapestry
1972	"The Day I Found Myself"	23	8	—	21		Soulful Tapestry
1972	"Sittin' on a Time Bomb (Waitin' for the Hurt to Come)"	96	33	—	—		Love, Peace & Soul
1972	"Innocent 'Til Proven Guilty"	101	37	—	—		Love, Peace & Soul
1972	"Ace in the Hole"	—	—	—	—		Love, Peace & Soul
1973	"If I Can't Fly"	—	—	—	—		—N/a
1976	"Somebody Is Always Messing Up a Good Thing" (feat. Sharon Cash)	—	—	—	—		—N/a
2024	"Here Comes the Rain Again"	—	—	—	—		
"—" denotes a recording that did not chart or was not released in that territory.

== Television and film credits ==
- 1968 - The Andy Williams Show - Back-up Singers.
- 1970 - Soul! (TV Series)
- 1971 - Soul Train TV Show, Season 1 | Episode 1.
- 1971 - American Bandstand (TV Series), Episode #14.49.
- 1971 - The Tonight Show Starring Johnny Carson.
- 1972 - The Sonny & Cher Comedy Hour, Episode #2.6.
- 1972 - American Bandstand (TV Series), Episode #15.32.
- 1972 - The Merv Griffin Show (TV Series), Season 9 | Episode 82.
- 1972 - Soul Train TV Show, Season 1 | Episode 17.
- 1973 - Midnight Special TV Show, Season 1 | Episode 9.
- 1973 - The Tonight Show Starring Johnny Carson.
- 1973 - Soul Train TV Show, Season 2 | Episode 24.
- 2013 - My Music: '70s & '80s Soul Rewind (TV Movie) - (archive footage).

== See also ==
- List of number-one hits (United States)
- List of artists who reached number one on the Hot 100 (U.S.)
