= Hot Wax Records =

Defunct American record label

- Parent company: HDH Records
- Founded: 1968
- Founder: Eddie Holland, Lamont Dozier and Brian Holland
- Defunct: 1977
- Status: Defunct
- Country of origin: United States
- Location: Detroit, Michigan

Hot Wax Records was a Detroit, Michigan-based record label, created by producers/songwriters Holland–Dozier–Holland (Eddie Holland, Lamont Dozier and Brian Holland) in 1968 when they left Motown.

== History ==
Until 1967, Holland, Dozier, and Holland were the top composers and producers for Motown, establishing acts like the Supremes and Four Tops with many major hits in the mid-1960s. Looking for more control and greater rewards, they left Motown in 1968 to launch Hot Wax Records, along with Invictus Records.

Hot Wax Records Inc was incorporated with Eddie Holland registered as both the company President and sole shareholder. The company's administrative offices were situated in Cadillac Tower, a 40-story office block at the corner of Cadillac Square and Bates, one block east of Woodward and two blocks north of the Coleman A. Young Municipal Center, (known then as the City-County Building). The original Detroit Historical Museum opened November 19, 1928 on the 23rd floor of the Cadillac Tower (then known as the Barlum Tower) and was referred to as the "highest Museum in the world". Holland Dozier Holland's own studio was a converted movie theatre, The Town Theater on Grand River Avenue.

The Hot Wax label, distributed by Buddah Records, was in full operation for about four years, racking up a series of successful records, such as million-sellers Honey Cone's "Want Ads" and the follow-up, "Stick Up" (the former was a number 1 hit in 1971 on the Billboard Hot 100 and both were number 1 hits on the Billboard R&B Singles charts) and "One Monkey Don't Stop No Show". Other hits included 100 Proof (Aged In Soul)'s "Somebody's Been Sleeping" (the label's third gold record in 1970); "Westbound Number 9" by Flaming Ember; and "Rip Off" by Laura Lee. Then towards the mid-1970s, like sister label Invictus, Hot Wax was distributed by CBS Records.

For contractual reasons, the names Holland/Dozier/Holland were not used on releases until 1970 (songs were initially credited to "(Ronald) Dunbar and (Edythe) Wayne"). Other writers/producers for the label included Greg Perry, William Weatherspoon, Angelo Bond, and General Johnson, who was also lead singer with the Invictus group, Chairmen of the Board.

The first Hot Wax label was black and white with flames coming out of the record at the top. The second Hot Wax label was white with orange swirling flames and black print. In 1973, when Hot Wax finally folded due to cash flow problems, Holland, Dozier and Holland moved their remaining artists to the Invictus Records label. Hot Wax was briefly revived and distributed by CBS Records between 1976 and 1977 when it, along with Invictus, folded and reorganized as HDH Records.

Dozier and the Holland brothers still own the catalogue, which is managed by HDH Records.

== LP Discography ==
- HA-701 - Take Me with You - Honey Cone [1970]
- HA-702 - Westbound Number 9 - The Flaming Ember [1970]
- HA-703 - When Will It End - Honey Cone [unissued]
- HA-704 - Someone's Been Sleeping In My Bed - 100 Proof (Aged in Soul) [1970]
- HA-705 - Sunshine - The Flaming Ember [1971]
- HA-706 - Sweet Replies - Honey Cone [1971]
- HA-707 - Soulful Tapestry - Honey Cone [1972]
- HA-708 - Woman's Love Rights - Laura Lee [1972]
- HA-709 - Deliciously Yours - 100 Proof (Aged in Soul) [unissued]
- HA-710 - Hot Wax Greatest Hits - Various Artists [1972]
- HA-711 - The Politicians featuring McKinley Jackson - The Politicians [1972]
- HA-712 - 100 Proof - 100 Proof (Aged in Soul) [1972]
- HA-713 - Love, Peace & Soul - Honey Cone [1972]
- HA-714 - Two Sides of Laura Lee - Laura Lee [1972]
- HA-715 - Best of Laura Lee - Laura Lee [1972]
- HA-716 - Think of the Children - Satisfaction Unlimited [1973]
