= Stick-Up =

1971 single by Honey Cone

Single by Honey Cone

from the album Soulful Tapestry
- B-side: "V.I.P."
- Released: August 1971
- Genre: R&B
- Label: Hot Wax
- Songwriter(s): General Johnson; Angelo Bond; Greg Perry

Honey Cone singles chronology
"Want Ads" (1971)	"Stick-Up" (1971)	"One Monkey Don't Stop No Show" (1971)

"Stick-Up" is Honey Cone's 1971 follow up single to the No.1 pop and R&B hit "Want Ads". It was No.1 on the R&B chart for three weeks; on the Hot 100, it peaked at No.11. It was their second consecutive certified Gold single.

== Chart history ==
=== Weekly charts ===
Chart (1971)	Peak position
Canada RPM	23
U.S. Billboard Hot 100	11
U.S. Billboard Best Selling Soul Singles	1
U.S. Cash Box Top 100	7

=== Year-end charts ===
Chart (1971)	Position
U.S. Billboard Hot 100	70
U.S. Cash Box	43
