= Want Ads =

- Side-A label of the 1971 US single

Single by Honey Cone

from the album Sweet Replies/Soulful Tapestry, (1971)
- B-side: "We Belong Together"
- Released: March 1971
- Recorded: Detroit, Michigan, 1969
- Genre: R&B
- Length: 3:50 (Soulful Tapestry version); 2:45 (Sweet Replies version)
- Label: Hot Wax
- Songwriters: Greg Perry, Barney Perkins, and General Norman Johnson
- Producer: Greg Perry

Honey Cone singles chronology
"Girls, It Ain't Easy" (1969)	"Want Ads" (1971)	"Stick-Up" (1971)

"Want Ads" is a song that was a million-selling No.1 pop and R&B hit recorded by female group Honey Cone originally for their second album Sweet Replies. A slightly extended version appears on their third album Soulful Tapestry, at which point the song became a hit. The song, recorded on the Detroit-based Hot Wax label, was written by Greg Perry, General Norman Johnson and Barney Perkins. It was produced by staff producer, Greg Perry, and features a young Ray Parker Jr. ("Ghostbusters") on rhythm guitar.

"Want Ads" was released as the first single from Soulful Tapestry in the United States in the spring of 1971 (see 1971 in music). It reached the top of the Billboard Hot 100 for one week and topped the R&B singles chart for three weeks in the United States, becoming the group's most successful single and their only No.1 placement on the pop charts.

== Song information ==
Initially, Perry and Johnson had written a song for a female singer called "Stick-Up", but the two decided that the song was not substantial enough so they re-wrote it with a change in chord progressions and new lyrics. With the catchy opening line of "Wanted, young man, single and free," "Want Ads" was born.

The idea for the song started when studio engineer Barney Perkins, while looking through the classified section of a newspaper, suggested that someone write a song about want ads. Perry, as producer and songwriter for the project, felt that the idea might work. The duo brought in Johnson, leader of Chairmen of the Board, to contribute to the writing, after co-writing "Somebody's Been Sleeping (In My Bed)" (a No.8 hit) with Perry for the Hot Wax group, 100 Proof (Aged in Soul).

The song was first recorded by another Hot Wax/Invictus act, Glass House (the group responsible for the top 10 R&B single "Crumbs Off the Table") led by Freda Payne's younger sister, Scherrie Payne. Payne did not like the song and with Perry being equally unsatisfied with that version, she and Freda recorded the song themselves. Still unsatisfied, Payne later suggested that Honey Cone lead singer Edna Wright record it after she had passed through the studio. The initial version of the song, titled "Stick Up," eventually was recorded and released as the group's follow up to "Want Ads." It peaked at No.11 on the pop charts in August and No.1 on the R&B charts in September.

The track was recorded by Ullanda McCullough and made into a disco song for her 1979 album "Love Zone" and by Taylor Dayne in 1988 for her hugely successful debut album Tell It to My Heart. Later, it was used as a sample in "Heaven," Mary Mary's 2005 lead-off single from their self-titled third studio album. The single made history breaking and setting records when it remained at No.1 for nine consecutive weeks on the Billboard Gospel Radio chart back in 2005. Edna Wright also makes a brief cameo appearance at the end of the music video singing along to the chorus and lip-synching to her own sampled vocals. The song is featured in the 2007 film Because I Said So.

In 2016, "Want Ads" was sampled in The Avalanches' track "Because I'm Me" from the album Wildflower.

== Chart performance ==
"Want Ads" debuted on the Billboard Hot 100 at No.79 on April 10, 1971. Within nine weeks on the chart, "Want Ads" was at the No.1 position for the week starting June 12. The song also remained No.1 on the R&B singles chart for three non-consecutive weeks for the week starting May 29, 1971 and after being bumped for one week by Aretha Franklin's rendition of Simon and Garfunkel's "Bridge over Troubled Water", the song re-positioned at No.1 for two more weeks starting June 12 through June 19. Billboard ranked it as the No. 13 song for 1971.

It received gold certification selling more than 1 million units in the U.S. The song's popularity had DJs playing the long version that was available on Soulful Tapestry. This was rare at the time. The song is said to have been a major contributor to the structure, sound, and grit of the pre-disco movement.

== Charts ==
=== Weekly charts ===
Chart (1971)	Peak position
Canada	11
US Billboard Hot 100	1
US Hot Soul Singles (Billboard)	1

=== Year-end charts ===
Chart (1971)	Position
Canada	97
US Billboard Hot 100	13
US R&B/Soul (Billboard)	3

== Certifications ==
Region	Certification	Certified units/sales
United States (RIAA)	Gold	1,000,000^{^}
^{^} Shipments figures based on certification alone.

== Credits and personnel ==
- Lead vocals: Edna Wright
- Background vocals: Shellie Clark, Carolyn Willis
- Engineer: Barney Perkins
