= Grand Central Terminal in popular culture =

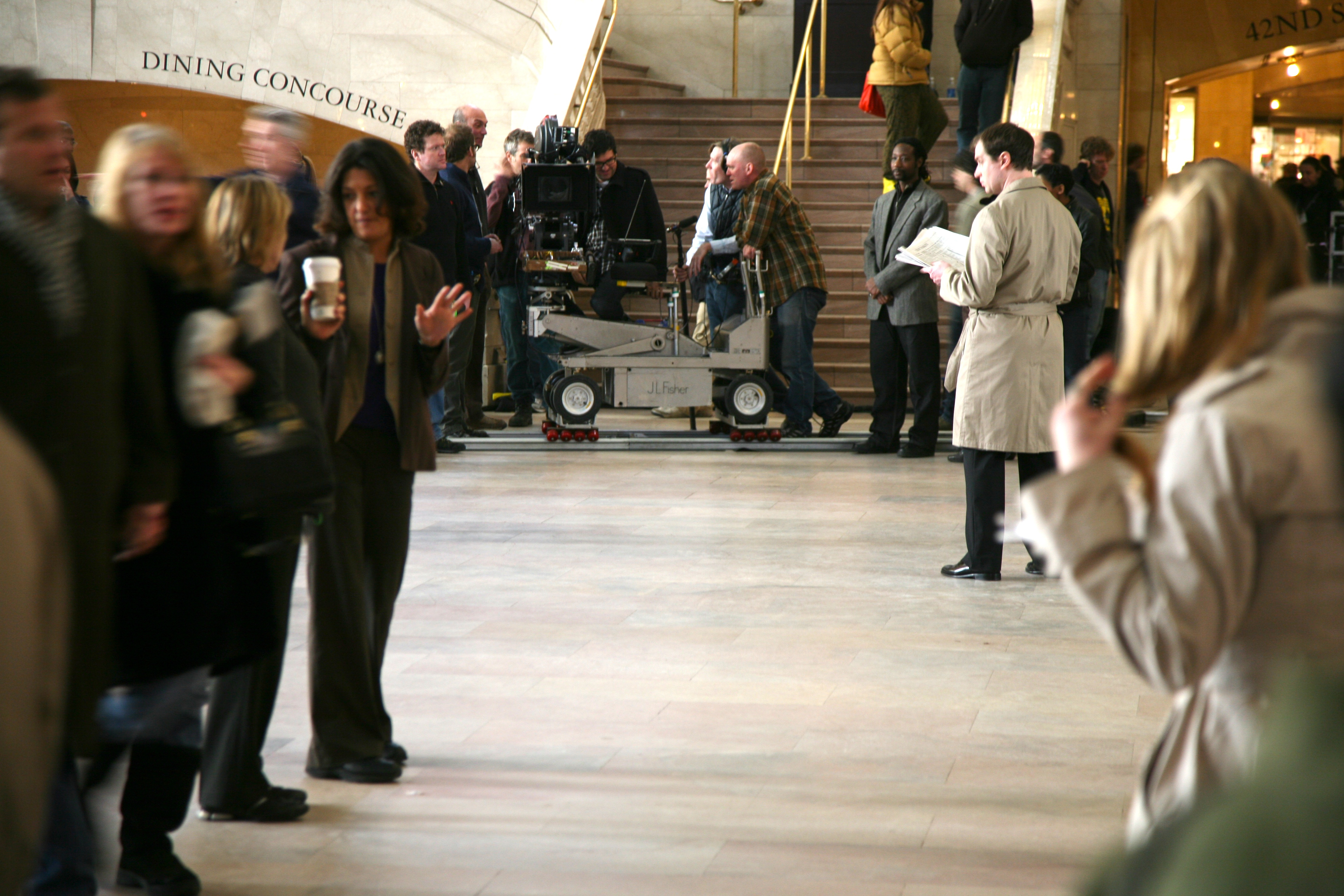
Filming in the Main Concourse, 2011

Grand Central Terminal, a train station in Manhattan, New York City, has been the subject, inspiration, or setting for literature, television and radio episodes, and films.

== Film and television ==
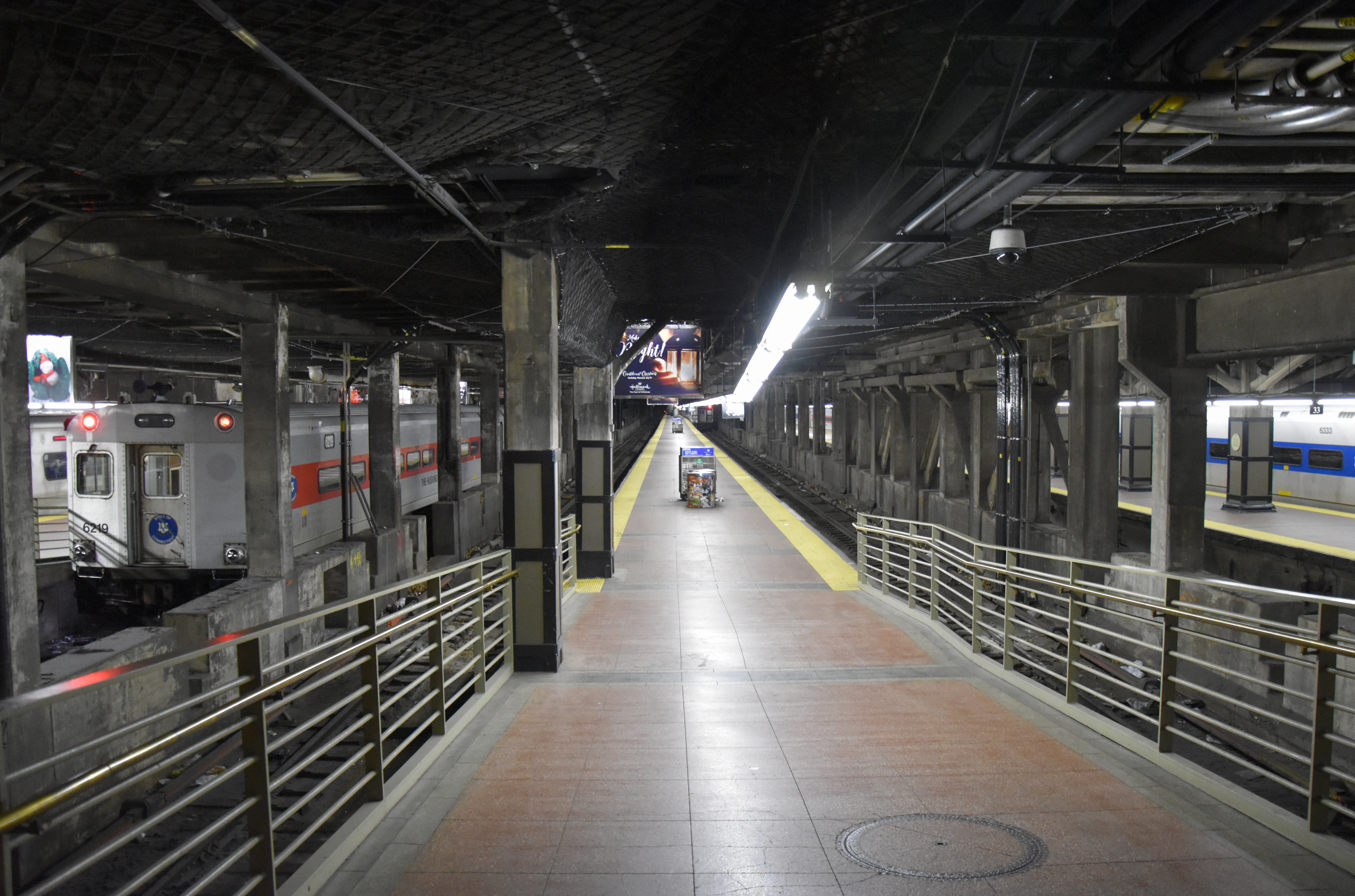
Platform at Track 34, commonly used in films

Many film and television productions have included scenes shot in the terminal. The MTA hosts about 67 large-scale and hundreds of smaller or amateur productions every year. Kyle McCarthy, who handles production at Grand Central, said, "Grand Central is one of the quintessential New York places. Whether filmmakers need an establishing shot of arriving in New York or transportation scenes, the restored landmark building is visually appealing and authentic." Especially during World War II, Grand Central has been a backdrop for romantic reunions between couples. After the terminal declined in the 1950s, it was more frequently used as a dark, dangerous place, even a metaphor for chaos and disorientation, featuring chase scenes, shootouts, homeless people, and the mentally ill. In the 1990 film The Freshman, for example, Matthew Broderick's character stumbles over an unconscious man and watches fearfully as petty crimes take place around him.

Almost every scene filmed in the terminal's train shed was shot on Track 34, one of the few areas without view-blocking structural columns.

The first filmed scene in which Grand Central Terminal appears may be the 1909 short comedy Mr. Jones Has a Card Party, while still under construction. The terminal's first cinematic appearance was in the 1930 musical film Puttin' On the Ritz, and its first Technicolor appearance was in the 1953 film The Band Wagon. Some films from the 20th century, including Grand Central Murder, The Thin Man Goes Home, Hello, Dolly!, and Beneath the Planet of the Apes used reconstructions of Grand Central, built in Hollywood, to stand in for the terminal. The Bollywood film Kabhi Alvida Naa Kehna uses other American train stations standing in for Grand Central. Additionally, the terminal was drawn and animated for use in the animated films Madagascar (2005) and Wreck-It Ralph (2012).

Other films in which the terminal appears include:

- The Breakdown (1912)
- Going Hollywood (1933)
- Hold Your Man (1933)
- Twentieth Century (1934)
- Spellbound (1945)
- The Clock (1945)
- Ma and Pa Kettle Go to Town (1950)
- North by Northwest (1959)
- Seconds (1966)
- The Out-of-Towners (1970)
- The French Connection (1971)
- Necrology (1971)
- Superman (1978)
- A Stranger Is Watching (1982)
- Koyaanisqatsi (1982)
- Escape from the Bronx (1983)
- Falling in Love (1984)
- The Cotton Club (1984)
- Chronos (1985)
- Midnight Run (1988)
- The House on Carroll Street (1988)
- Großer Bahnhof (1990)
- Loose Cannons (1990)
- The Fisher King (1991)
- The Prince of Tides (1991)
- Baraka (1992)
- Carlito's Way (1993)
- Hackers (1995)
- One Fine Day (1996)
- The Ice Storm (1997)
- Armageddon (1998)
- Godzilla (1998)
- U.S. Marshals (1998)
- Men in Black II (2002)
- Kal Ho Naa Ho (2003)
- Eternal Sunshine of the Spotless Mind (2004)
- Kabhi Alvida Naa Kehna (2006)
- I Am Legend (2007)
- Revolutionary Road (2008)
- Arthur (2011)
- Friends with Benefits (2011)
- The Avengers (2012)
- Before We Go (2015)
- The Girl on the Train (2016)
- 2:22 (2017)
- The Commuter (2018)
- John Wick: Chapter 3 (2019)

Notable documentaries about the terminal include Grand Central, a 1982 film narrated by James Earl Jones and featuring Philip Johnson and Ed Koch.

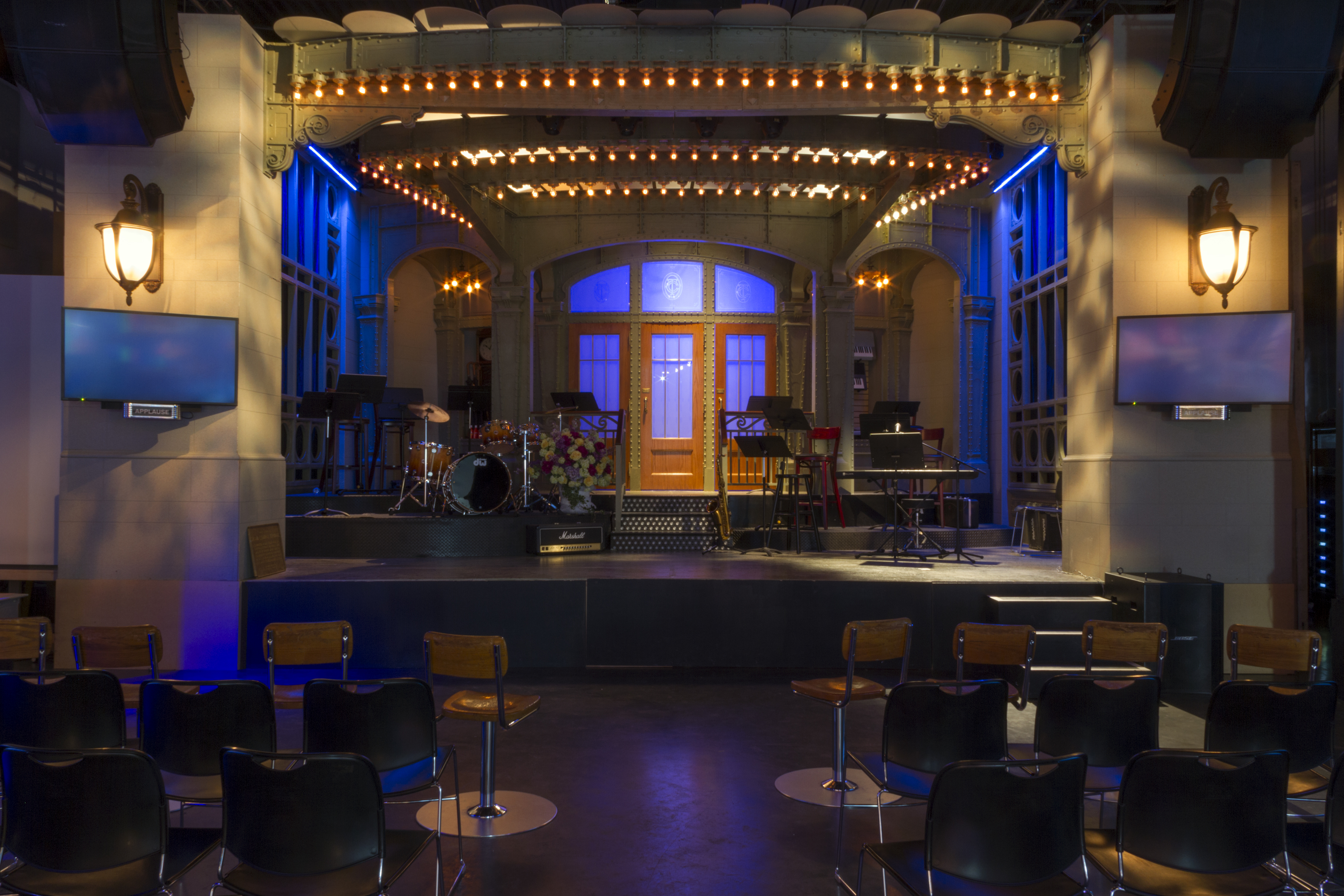
Saturday Night Live stage replica at a Museum of Broadcast Communications exhibition, 2018

On October 19, 2017, several of these films were screened in the terminal for an event created by the MTA, Rooftop Films, and the Museum of the Moving Image. The event featured a cinematic history lecture by architect and author James Sanders.

Grand Central Terminal's architecture, including its Main Concourse clock, are depicted on the stage of Saturday Night Live, a long-running NBC television show. Warren and Wetmore designed The soundstage reconstruction of the terminal in Studio 8H was first installed in 2003.

== Literature ==
Literature featuring the terminal includes Report on Grand Central Terminal, written in 1948 by nuclear physicist Leo Szilard; The Catcher in the Rye by J. D. Salinger; The House of Mirth by Edith Wharton; Grand Central Murder by Sue MacVeigh, which was made into the eponymous film in 1942; A Stranger Is Watching by Mary Higgins Clark; and the 1946 children's classic The Taxi That Hurried by Lucy Sprague Mitchell. The infrastructure in Grand Central inspired the novel The Invention of Hugo Cabret, and in turn, the film Hugo. The dangerous life of homeless men and women in Grand Central and its tunnels and passageways inspired Lee Stringer's Grand Central Winter: Stories from the Street and Tina S.'s collaboration with journalist Jamie Pastor Bolnick in the autobiography Living at the Edge of the World: A Teenager's Survival in the Tunnels of Grand Central Station. The terminal inspired the title of the 1945 women's Modernist novel By Grand Central Station I Sat Down and Wept by Elizabeth Smart.

== Other works ==
Grand Central Station, an NBC radio drama set at the terminal, ran from 1937 to 1953. Among the video games that feature the terminal are Spider-Man: The Official Movie Game, The Incredible Hulk (2008), Marvel's Spider-Man, True Crime: New York City, Lego Marvel Super Heroes, and Tom Clancy's The Division.

A Lego replica of the terminal is situated in Miniland USA, an exhibit at Legoland California. The cutaway model shows elaborate interior details of the station building.

Bassist Larry Graham, formerly of Sly and the Family Stone, named his own funk band (and their self-titled debut) Graham Central Station.
