= Do Me Right =

Do Me Right may refer to:

- Do Me Right (album), by the Detroit Emeralds
- "Do Me Right" (song), by The Detroit Emeralds
- "Do Me Right", a song by Jamelia from the 2006 album Walk with Me
- "Do Me Right", a disco song by Dynasty from the 1980 album Adventures in the Land of Music
