= Forrest (singer) =

American singer (1953–2013)

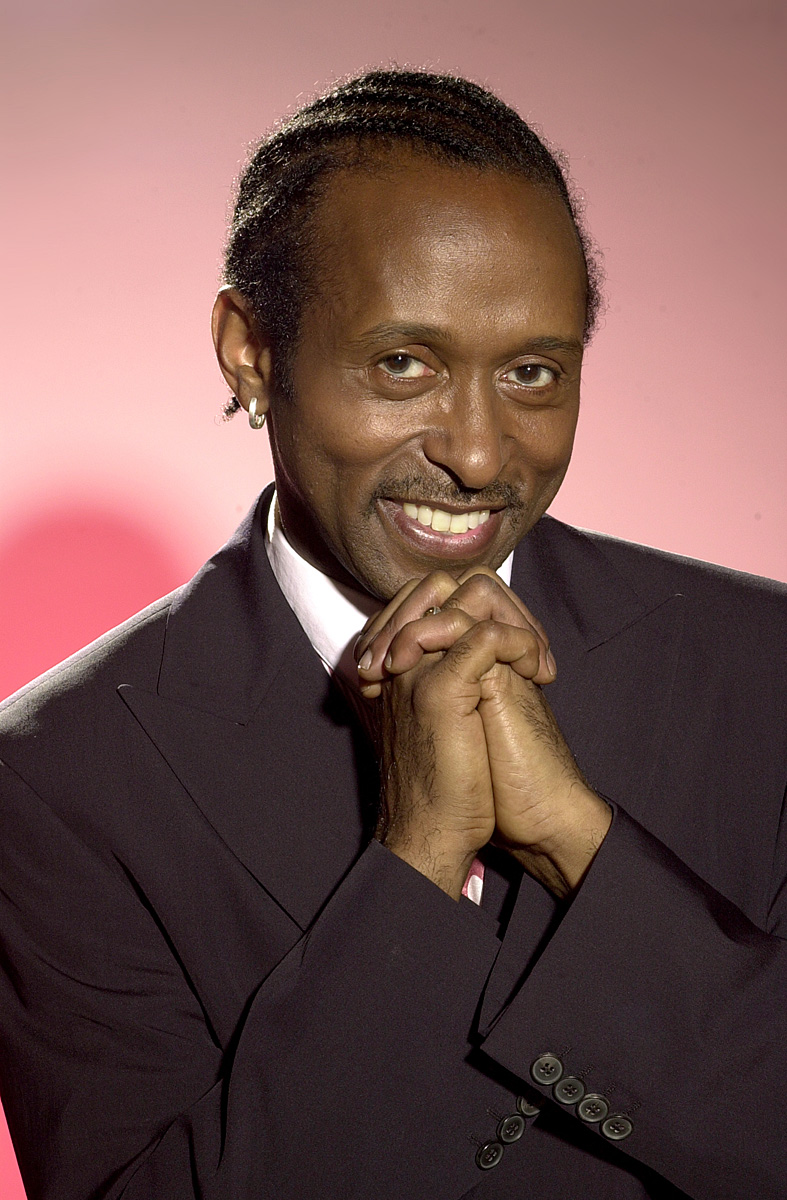

Background information
- Born: Forrest Melvill Thomas Jr. April 21, 1953; Galveston, Texas, United States
- Died: September 9, 2013 (aged 60) Tilburg, Netherlands
- Genres: Soul; funk; post-disco
- Occupation: Singer-songwriter
- Instrument: Vocals
- Years active: 1982–2013
- Label: Ariola

Forrest Melvill Thomas Jr. (April 21, 1953 – September 9, 2013), known professionally as Forrest, was an American singer, based in the Netherlands.

== Life and career ==
Born in Galveston, Texas, where he sang in church during childhood, he moved to Los Angeles, California as a teen and won several contests there as a singer. After this stage in his career, he moved to the Netherlands, where he had a hit in 1983 with the song "Rock the Boat", a cover of the Hues Corporation's 1974 No. 1 US hit. His version peaked at No. 4 on the UK Singles Chart and in his native United States at No. 9 on the Hot Dance Club Play chart.

A second single, "Feel the Need in Me" (originally by the Detroit Emeralds), was a hit in the UK, reaching No. 17. A third single, "One Lover (Don't Stop the Show)", peaked at No. 67 in the UK.

He and his wife, Manon Thomas, a television presenter had two sons, but later separated, after which he began to concentrate again on music. He sang in R.E.S.P.E.C.T., a theatre show, in 2001, dedicated to 1960s soul music. He was asked by DJ Roog to front the band Planet Hardsoul, who had a minor hit with their cover of "Where Did Our Love Go". In December 2012, Thomas married again, to Diana van Lippen.

== Death ==
On September 9, 2013, Forrest died of a stroke in a hospital in Tilburg, Netherlands, aged 60.

== Discography ==
=== Albums ===
- One Lover (Ariola, 1983)

=== Singles ===
Year	Single	Peak chart positions				Certifications
Year	Single	US Dance	AUS	UK	NLD	Certifications
1983	"Rock the Boat"	9	33	4	7	BPI: Silver
1983	"Dancing with My Shadow"	—	—	—	—	
1983	"One Lover (Don't Stop the Show)"	—	—	67	37	
1983	"Feel the Need in Me"	—	—	17	20	
1984	"Dance All Night"	—	—	—	—	
1984	"She's So Divine"	—	—	98	—	
1986	"She's So Free"	—	—	—	—	
1987	"Valerie"	—	—	—	—	
1989	"You Got What It Takes"	—	—	—	—	
1989	"Rock the Boat '89"	—	—	—	—	
1989	"Feelin' Alright"	—	—	—	—	
"—" denotes releases that did not chart or were not released in that territory.
