= Rockin' Soul =

Single by The Hues Corporation

from the album Rockin' Soul
- B-side: "Go to the Poet"
- Released: October 1974
- Recorded: 1974
- Genre: Disco; soul; R&B
- Length: 3:06
- Label: RCA Records
- Songwriter: Wally Holmes
- Producers: Tom Sellers, Wally Holmes

The Hues Corporation singles chronology
"Rock the Boat" (1974)	"Rockin' Soul" (1974)	"Love Corporation" (1975)

"Rockin' Soul" is a song by American trio the Hues Corporation, written by Wally Holmes. The song is the title track of the band's 1974 second album Rockin' Soul.

The song was a top 20 hit in the U.S., reaching No. 18 on the Billboard Hot 100, their third of five charting singles. "Rockin' Soul" was also a top 40 hit in Canada and the UK.

== Chart history ==
=== Weekly charts ===
Chart (1974–75)	Peak position
Canada Top Singles (RPM)	33
Canada RPM Adult Contemporary	40
UK Singles (Official Charts)	24
US Billboard Hot 100	18
US Hot Soul Singles (Billboard)	6
US Disco Action	5
US Cash Box Top 100	28

=== Year-end charts ===
Chart (1974)	Rank
US Billboard R&B	44
