= Your Love (Graham Central Station song) =

Single by Graham Central Station

from the album Ain't No 'Bout-A-Doubt It
- B-side: "I Believe in You"
- Released: 1975
- Recorded: 1975
- Genre: Soul
- Length: 3:18
- Label: Warner Bros.
- Composer: Larry Graham
- Producer: Larry Graham

Graham Central Station singles chronology
"Feel the Need" (1975)	"Your Love" (1975)	"It's Alright" (1975)

"Your Love" is a 1975 single by Graham Central Station, written by Larry Graham. The single went to number one for one week on the Billboard Hot Soul Singles chart, peaked at thirty-eight on the Billboard Hot 100 chart, and was the group's only top 40 entry.
