= One in a Million You =

Single by Larry Graham

from the album One in a Million You
- B-side: "The Entertainer"
- Released: June 1980
- Length: 4:10
- Label: Warner Bros.
- Songwriter(s): Sam Dees

Larry Graham singles chronology
"The Jam" (1976)	"One in a Million You" (1980)	"When We Get Married" (1980)

"One in a Million You" is a single by Larry Graham from his album of the same name. The song was written by Sam Dees and produced by Larry Graham. "One in a Million You" was a gold record.

== Chart performance ==
Graham is the former bass player for Sly & the Family Stone and frontman for Graham Central Station. The ballad reached the top ten on the US Billboard Hot 100 chart, peaking at No. 9 in September 1980 while also hitting No. 1 on the R&B chart for two weeks.

== Charts ==
=== Weekly charts ===
Chart (1980)	Peak position
US Billboard Hot 100	9
US Adult Contemporary (Billboard)	37
US Hot Soul Singles (Billboard)	1
US Cash Box Top 100	15

=== Year-end charts ===
Chart (1980)	Position
US Hot Soul Singles (Billboard)	6

== Popular culture ==
The song was used in the movie Nutty Professor II: The Klumps.

The song was covered by Dionne Warwick on her Arista album Hot! Live and Otherwise.
