= Fleming Williams =

American singer

- Born: December 26, 1943; Flint, Michigan, US
- Died: 1992/February 15, 1998 (disputed)
- Genres: R&B, Soul, Pop, Jazz, Disco
- Occupations: Singer, song writer, session musician
- Years active: 1970s
- Labels: RCA Records, Better World
- Formerly of: The Hues Corporation

Fleming Williams (December 26, 1943 – 1992 or February 15, 1998) was an American singer known as a member of the group The Hues Corporation and as the lead singer on their hit "Rock the Boat".

== Background ==
Williams was a tenor from Flint, Michigan. An early group he was a member of was called the 21st Generation, a group that also featured James Cobbin and Ron Murray. The group recorded a single, "I Need Love" / "Hey James" that was released in 1970 on the Tri-City label. It was arranged by alto saxophonist and arranger Willie "Face" Smith and produced by Choker Smith. In the same year, he had his own composition "Poverty Child" released as the A side of a single released on the Better World record label. It was also arranged by Smith and produced by Campbell.

Williams wasn't the original lead singer of the Hues Corporation. For the first years of existence the group had Karl Russell but after their participation in the Blacula-film project he was replaced by Williams. Williams was actually discovered by Hues Corp member H. Ann Kelley. The group had a no 1 hit with "Rock The Boat" which was the first disco hit to have that distinction.

According to fellow Hues Corp bandmate St. Clair Lee, Williams initially left the group after they recorded the first album, Freedom for the Stallion, which featured "Rock the Boat," and was replaced by Tommy Brown. However, after things did not work out with Tommy, Williams was brought back on board. But around 1975, Karl Russell rejoined the band taking over the role of lead singer after Fleming Williams had left for good.

== Session work ==
In 1972, along with former 21st Century bandmate James Cobbin, he provided background vocals for David Axelrod's The Auction album. He had also recorded with Cannonball Adderley and George Duke on Adderley's Soul of the Bible album. He provided background vocals for Lee Garrett's Heat For The Feets album. Along with Jim Gilstrap he provided background vocals for Candi Staton's Young Hearts Run Free album.

== Death ==
Williams died at some point in the 1990s. While several early Internet sources listed September 1992 as a possible date of death, none of them have remained definitive in this assertion (in addition to inaccurately listing his year of birth as 1953), and most other sources, including the Social Security Death Index, list his death as February 15, 1998. Anecdotal comments and speculation on the web have attributed his death to causes ranging from a "long illness" to "suicide." In the context of a musical on Williams' life (see next section) The New McCree Theatre stated that Fleming Williams actually committed suicide in 1998. Regardless of the actual cause of death, most sources agree that a major contributing factor was a lengthy battle with drug abuse.

== Musical ==
A musical based on his life called Rock the Boat: The Fleming Williams Story and co-written by Williams' mother ran at The New McCree Theatre in Williams' home town Flint. There was a message about the dangers of drugs in the musical production. Williams as a young man was played by a local actor Marquawan Burnett and Carl Williams played him as an older man.

== Compositions ==
- "Poverty Child", Appears on the Fleming Williams solo single of the same name
- "This Love", Appears on the Barry White & Glodean White – Barry & Glodean album
- "Oooo....Ahhh....", (Co-written with Barry White & Jakki Milligan), Appears on the Barry White – Beware! album
- "A Special Love Song", Appears on the Positive Express – Changin' Times album

== Discography ==
=== Solo ===
- Fleming Williams - Poverty Child / Shades Of Time - Can You Dig It - Better World – 4357 (1970)

=== Lead vocal ===
==== Guest ====
- David Axelrod - "The Auction" and "Freedom", appears on album: David Axelrod – The Auction Decca – DL 75355 (1972)
- Cannonball Adderley - "Fun In The Church", Appears on album: Cannonball Adderley Presents Nat Adderley Sextet, The* Plus Rick Holmes – Soul Of The Bible - Capitol Records – SABB-11120 (1972)

==== Lead singer ====
- The Hues Corporation - Freedom for the Stallion - RCA Victor – APL1-0323 (1973)
- The Hues Corporation - Rockin' Soul - RCA Victor – APL1-0775 (1974)

=== Backing vocals ===
- Nat Adderley Sextet– Soul of The Bible - Capitol – (1972)
- Cannonball Adderley – Big Man: The Legend Of John Henry - Fantasy – F-79006 (1975)
- David Axelrod – The Auction - Decca – DL 75355 (1972)
- Candi Staton - Young Hearts Run Free - Warner Bros. Records – BS 2948 (1976)
- Lee Garrett - Heat For The Feets - Chrysalis – CHR 1109 (1976)
- Millington - Ladies On The Stage - United Artists Records – UA-LA821-G (1977)
- Ned Doheny - Prone - CBS/Sony – 25AP 1359 (1979)
- Jeff Porcaro – Session Works II - Sony Music Japan International Inc. – SICP-20388 (2012) (CD Compilation
