= Happy Now =

Happy Now or Happy Now? may refer to:

== Film and theatre ==
- Happy Now? (play), a play by Lucinda Coxon
- Happy Now? (film), a British film starring Ioan Gruffudd

== Music ==
=== Albums ===
- Happy Now (Gang of Four album), 2019
- Happy Now (Thick album), 2022
- "Happy Now", 1987 EP by the Beloved

=== Songs ===
- "Happy Now?" (No Doubt song), 1997
- "Happy Now" (Bon Jovi song), 2009
- "Happy Now" (Take That song), 2011
- "Happy Now" (Kygo song), 2018, featuring Sandro Cavazza
- "Happy Now" (Zedd and Elley Duhé song), 2018
- "Happy Now", 2017 song by Slander

== See also ==
- Are You Happy Now? (disambiguation)
