= Now Do U Wanta Dance =

Studio album by Graham Central Station
- Released: April 1, 1977
- Recorded: 1977
- Genre: Funk, soul
- Label: Warner Bros.
- Producer: Larry Graham

Graham Central Station chronology
Mirror (1976)	Now Do U Wanta Dance (1977)	My Radio Sure Sounds Good to Me (1978)

Professional ratings
Review scores
Source	Rating
AllMusic	3/5 stars

Now Do U Wanta Dance is the fifth album by Graham Central Station. Released on April 1, 1977, the album peaked at number twelve on the Billboard Top Soul Albums.

== Track listing ==
All songs written by Larry Graham except where indicated.

1. "Happ-E-2-C-U-A-Ginn" 3:55
2. "Now Do-U-Wanta Dance" 2:56
3. "Last Train" 3:53
4. "Love and Happiness" (Al Green, Mabon Hodges) 3:37
5. "Earthquake" 6:44
6. "Crazy Chicken" 1:01
7. "Stomped Beat-Up and Whooped" 3:43
8. "Lead Me On" (Deadric Malone) 3:38
9. "Saving My Love for You" 3:52
10. "Have Faith in Me" 6:40

== Personnel ==
- Larry Graham – bass, synthesizer, keyboards, lead and backing vocals
- Hershall "Happiness" Kennedy – keyboards, synthesizer, clavinet, trumpet
- Gaylord "Flash" Birch – drums, vocals
- David "Dynamite" Vega – guitar
- Gail "Baby Face" Muldrow – guitar, vocals
- Robert "Butch" Sam – keyboards, organ, piano, vocals
- Tina Graham, Natalie Neilson, Shelia McKinney – vocals
- Dennis Marcellino, Jerry Martini, Max Haskett, Mic Gillette – horns

== Charts ==
Chart (1977)	Peak position
Billboard Pop Albums	67
Billboard Top Soul Albums	12

=== Singles ===
Year	Single	Chart positions
Year	Single	US Soul
1977	"Now Do-U-Wanta Dance"	10
