= Are You Happy? (disambiguation) =

Are You Happy? is a 2016 music album by Arashi.

Are You Happy? may refer to:

- "Are You Happy? / A Gonna", a 2018 single by Morning Musume
- "Are You Happy?", a 2009 single by Days Difference
- "Are You Happy", a song by Iron Butterfly from the 1968 album In-A-Gadda-Da-Vida
- "Are You Happy?", a song by Graham Central Station from the 1978 album My Radio Sure Sounds Good to Me

== See also ==
- Are You Happy Now? (disambiguation)
