= You Want It, You Got It (song) =

Single by The Detroit Emeralds

from the album You Want It, You Got It
- B-side: "Till You Decide to Come Home"
- Released: December 1971
- Genre: Soul
- Length: 2:54
- Label: Westbound 192
- Songwriter: Abrim Tilmon
- Producer: Katouzzion

The Detroit Emeralds singles chronology
"Wear This Ring (with Love)" (1971)	"You Want It, You Got It" (1971)	"Baby Let Me Take You (In My Arms)" (1972)

"You Want It, You Got It" is a song written by Abrim Tilmon and performed by The Detroit Emeralds. The song was produced by Katouzzion and arranged by Abrim Tilmon and Johnny Allen.

== Background ==
The song was featured on their 1972 album, You Want It, You Got It.

== Chart performance ==
In 1972, "You Want It, You Got It" reached #5 on the R&B chart, and #36 on the Billboard Hot 100, and outside the US, the song peaked at #12 on the UK Singles Chart.

== Popular culture ==
- Lil Romeo covered this song in the 2001 film Max Keeble's Big Move.
- The song was featured in The Blind Side; 2009 film by John Lee Hancock.
