= Baby Let Me Take You (In My Arms) =

Single by The Detroit Emeralds

from the album You Want It, You Got It
- B-side: "I'll Never Sail the Sea Again"
- Released: May 1972
- Genre: Soul
- Length: 3:46
- Label: Westbound 203
- Songwriter(s): Abrim Tilmon
- Producer(s): Katouzzion

The Detroit Emeralds singles chronology
| "You Want It, You Got It" (1971) | "Baby Let Me Take You (In My Arms)" (1972) | "Feel the Need in Me" (1972) |

"Baby Let Me Take You (In My Arms)" is a song written by Abrim Tilmon and performed by The Detroit Emeralds. It reached #4 on the R&B chart and #24 on the Billboard Hot 100 in 1972. The song was featured on their 1972 album, You Want It, You Got It.

The song was produced by Katouzzion and arranged by Abrim Tilmon and Johnny Allen.

The single was ranked #95 on Billboard's Year-End Hot 100 singles of 1972.

== Chart history ==
=== Weekly charts ===
| Chart (1972) | Peak position |
|---|---|
| U.S. Billboard Hot 100 | 24 |
| U.S. Billboard R&B | 4 |
| U.S. Cash Box Top 100 | 19 |

=== Year-end charts ===
| Chart (1972) | Rank |
|---|---|
| U.S. Billboard Hot 100 | 95 |
| U.S. Cash Box | 91 |

== Sampled ==
- Joe Budden sampled "Baby Let Me Take You (In My Arms)" on his song "#1" from his 2003 album Joe Budden.
- Eazy-E sampled "Baby Let Me Take You (In My Arms)" on his song "Eazy-Duz-It" from the 1988 album Eazy-Duz-It.
- De La Soul sampled "Baby Let Me Take You (In My Arms)" on their song "Say No Go" from their 1989 album, 3 Feet High and Rising.
- Deja-Vu sampled "Baby Let Me Take You (In My Arms)" on their song "Going Under" (1998).
- Krayzie Bone and Wish Bone sampled "Baby Let Me Take You (In My Arms)" on their song "12 Gauge" from the 2003 album Leatha Face: The Legends Underground (Part 1).
