= You're Gettin' a Little Too Smart =

Single by the Detroit Emeralds

from the album I'm in Love with You
- B-side: "Heaven Couldn't Be Like This"
- Released: May 1973
- Genre: Soul
- Length: 3:21
- Label: Westbound 213
- Songwriter: Abrim Tilmon
- Producer: Katouzzion

The Detroit Emeralds singles chronology
"Feel the Need in Me" (1972)	"You're Gettin' a Little Too Smart" (1973)	"Lee" (1973)

"You're Gettin' a Little Too Smart" is a song written by Abrim Tilmon and performed by the Detroit Emeralds. It was released as the first single from their 1973 album I'm in Love with You, and reached number 10 on the R&B chart and just missed the Billboard Hot 100 in 1973, peaking at number 101.

The song was produced by Katouzzion and arranged by Abrim Tilmon and Johnny Allen.
