= Release Yourself =

Studio album by Graham Central Station
- Released: September 1974
- Recorded: 1974
- Studio: The Record Plant, Sausalito, California
- Genre: Funk
- Length: 37:40
- Label: Warner Bros. Records
- Producer: Larry Graham

Graham Central Station chronology
Graham Central Station (1974)	Release Yourself (1974)	Ain't No 'Bout-A-Doubt It (1975)

Professional ratings
Review scores
Source	Rating
Allmusic	4/5 stars

Release Yourself is the second album by Graham Central Station, released in 1974. The cover photograph was taken at Old Saint Hilary's Church, Tiburon, California.

== Track listing ==
All songs written by Larry Graham except where indicated.

Side One
No.	Title	Length
1.	"G.C.S."	3:24
2.	"Release Yourself"	4:44
3.	"Got To Go Through It To Get To It"	3:42
4.	"I Believe In You""	4:51

Side Two
No.	Title	Writer(s)	Length
5.	"'Tis Your Kind of Music"		5:41
6.	"Hey Mr. Writer"		4:03
7.	"Feel the Need"	Abrim Tilmon	3:53
8.	"Today"		6:43

== Personnel ==
Graham Central Station

- Larry Graham - bass, guitar, ARP synthesizer, tambourine, lead and backing vocals, cover concept
- Hershall "Happiness" Kennedy - horns, Clavinet, electric piano, tambourine, vocals
- Willie "Wild" Sparks - drums
- David "Dynamite" Vega - guitar
- Robert "Butch" Sam - organ, piano, tambourine, vocals
- Patryce "Choc'Let" Banks - drum programming [funk box], tambourine, vocals

Additional

- Emilio Castillo, Greg Adams, Lenny Pickett, Mic Gillette, Stephen Kupka - horns

Technical

- Tom Salisbury - cover design, photography

== Charts ==
The album peaked at number twenty-two on the Billboard Top Soul Albums in 1974.

Chart (1974)	Peak position
Billboard Pop Albums	51
Billboard Top Soul Albums	22
