= You Want It, You Got It =

Album by The Detroit Emeralds

Studio album by The Detroit Emeralds
- Released: 1972
- Genre: Soul, funk
- Label: Westbound
- Producer: Katouzzion

The Detroit Emeralds chronology
Do Me Right (1971)	You Want It, You Got It (1972)	I'm in Love with You (1973)

Singles from You Want It, You Got It
- 1. "You Want It, You Got It"/"Till You Decide to Come Home" Released: December 1971; 2. "Baby Let Me Take You (In My Arms)"/"I'll Never Sail the Sea Again" Released: May 1972; 3. "Feel the Need in Me"/"There's a Love for Me Somewhere" Released: October 1972

Professional ratings
Review scores
Source	Rating
AllMusic	4/5 stars
Christgau's Record Guide	B+

You Want It, You Got It is the second studio album by American vocal group, The Detroit Emeralds, released in 1972 through Westbound Records.

== Commercial performance ==
The album peaked at No. 37 on the R&B albums chart. It also reached No. 78 on the Billboard 200. The album features the title track, which peaked at No. 5 on the Hot Soul Singles chart and No. 36 on the Billboard Hot 100, "Baby Let Me Take You (In My Arms)", which charted at No. 4 on the Hot Soul Singles chart and No. 24 on the Billboard Hot 100, and "Feel the Need in Me", which reached No. 22 on the Hot Soul Singles chart.

== Track listing ==
All tracks are written by Abrim Tilmon, except where noted.

Side one
No.	Title	Length
1.	"You Want It, You Got It"	2:56
2.	"There's a Love for Me Somewhere"	2:23
3.	"I'll Never Sail the Sea Again"	3:34
4.	"Take My Love"	3:37

Side two
No.	Title	Length
5.	"Feel the Need in Me"	3:37
6.	"I've Got to Move"	3:01
7.	"Baby Let Me Take You (In My Arms)"	3:46
8.	"I Bet You Get the One You Love" (Abrim Tilmon, James Mitchell)	2:09
9.	"Till You Decide To Come Home"	2:43

== Personnel ==
- Katouzzion – producer
- Abrim Tilmon – arranger, conductor
- Johnny Allen – arranger, conductor

== Charts ==
Album

Chart (1972)	Peaks
U.S. Billboard Top LPs	78
U.S. Billboard Top Soul LPs	37

Singles

Year	Single	Peaks	
Year	Single	US	US R&B
1971	"You Want It, You Got It"	36	5
1972	"Baby Let Me Take You (In My Arms)"	24	4
1972	"Feel the Need in Me"	—	22
