= Just Be My Lady =

Studio album by Larry Graham
- Released: 1981
- Studios: The Music Machine, Beverly Hills, Hollywood, California
- Genres: R&B, funk
- Label: Warner Bros.
- Producer: Larry Graham

Larry Graham chronology
One in a Million You (1980)	Just Be My Lady (1981)	Sooner or Later (1982)

Just Be My Lady is an album by the American R&B and funk musician Larry Graham, released in 1981. Graham re-recorded the title track for his 1998 album, GCS 2000.

The album peaked at No. 46 on the Billboard Top LPs & Tape chart. It peaked at No. 8 on the Billboard Top Black Albums chart.

== Production ==
Graham continued to move away from funk music, putting more emphasis on his R&B ballads. He produced the album and played almost all of the instruments. "Guess Who" is a cover of the Jesse Belvin song.

== Critical reception ==
Professional ratings
Review scores
Source	Rating
AllMusic	3/5 stars
The Encyclopedia of Popular Music	3/5 stars
The New Rolling Stone Record Guide	1/5 stars

The Washington Informer thought that "Graham has established himself as a vocal personality that rivals, perhaps overshadows, his instrumental personality—one drips with tenderness while the other booms furiously." Stereo Review called the album "a set of slow ballads oozed out in Lou Rawls-like low gear." The Bangor Daily News determined that "what traces of his old R&B background exist have been pasteurized and homogenized."

AllMusic wrote that "some selections are shaded with Graham's doo wop and gospel influence, and all have much appeal." Dave Marsh, in The New Rolling Stone Record Guide, dismissed Graham as "one of those lugubriously philosophizing soul crooners."

== Track listing ==
All tracks are written by Larry Graham; except where noted.

No.	Title	Writer(s)	Length
1.	"Just Be My Lady"		4:24
2.	"Loving You Is Beautiful"		4:29
3.	"Guess Who"	Jesse Belvin, Jo Ann Belvin	4:58
4.	"Our Love Keeps Growing Strong"		4:14
5.	"Can't Nobody Take Your Place"		4:40
6.	"No Place Like Home"		3:40
7.	"Baby, You Are My Sunshine"		4:06
8.	"I Just Love You"		3:38
9.	"Feels Like Love"		3:26
10.	"Remember When"		4:07

== Personnel ==
- Larry Graham – lead and backing vocals, bass, drums, guitar, keyboards, arrangements
- Wilton Rabb – guitar, backing vocals
- Eric Daniels – keyboards, backing vocals
- Noel Closson – drums on "Our Love Keeps Growing Strong", "Our Love Keeps Growing Strong" and "Feels Like Love"
- Carroll Stephens – strings

Technical

- Tina Graham – production assistance, backing vocals
