= Mirror (Graham Central Station album) =

Studio album by Graham Central Station
- Released: May 1976
- Recorded: 1976
- Studios: Wally Heider Studios, San Francisco, California
- Genres: Soul; funk
- Label: Warner Bros. Records
- Producer: Larry Graham

Graham Central Station chronology
Ain't No 'Bout-A-Doubt It (1975)	Mirror (1976)	Now Do U Wanta Dance (1977)

Singles from Mirror
- 1. "Love (Covers a Multitude of Sin)" Released: April 1976; 2. "Entrow" Released: July 1976; 3. "I Got a Reason" Released: November 1976

Professional ratings
Review scores
Source	Rating
AllMusic	3/5 stars

Mirror is the fourth album by Graham Central Station, released in 1976. The album peaked at number seven on the Billboard Top Soul Albums chart.

== Track listing ==
All songs written by Larry Graham.

Side One
No.	Title	Length
1.	"Entrow"	7:09
2.	"Love (Covers a Multitude of Sin)"	3:49
3.	"Mirror"	3:50
4.	"Do Yah"	3:55

Side Two
No.	Title	Length
5.	"Save Me"	5:17
6.	"I Got a Reason"	3:48
7.	"Priscilla"	3:15
8.	"Forever"	6:54

== Personnel ==
- Larry Graham - bass guitar, synthesizer, lead and backing vocals
- Hershall "Happiness" Kennedy - clavinet, vocals
- Gaylord "Flash" Birch - drums, vocals
- David "Dynamite" Vega - guitar, vocals
- Robert "Butch" Sam - organ, piano, vocals
- Patryce "Choc'Let" Banks - drum programming (Funk Box), percussion, vocals

== Charts ==
Chart (1976)	Peak position
Billboard Pop Albums	46
Billboard Top Soul Albums	7
