= Sooner or Later (Larry Graham song) =

Single by Larry Graham

from the album Sooner or Later
- Released: 1982
- Genre: Funk
- Length: 5:10 (12" version); 3:38 (album version)
- Label: Warner Bros. PRO-A-1046 (US); Warner Bros. K17925T (UK)
- Songwriter: Larry Graham
- Producer: Larry Graham

Larry Graham singles chronology
"Don't Stop When You're Hot" (1982)	"Sooner or Later" (1982)	"I'm Sick and Tired" (1983)

"Sooner or Later" is a song recorded by American guitarist, singer-songwriter and producer Larry Graham. The song, written and produced by Graham, was released in 1982 by Warner Bros. Records. The song is included on his album of the same name.

"Sooner or Later" was moderately successful, peaking number 17 on the Billboard Dance chart and number 27 on the R&B chart in 1982. The single even crossed over to British pop chart, reaching number 54.

== Reception ==
In July 1982, the song was included in the Billboard Top Single Picks, recommended section, stating "Graham's recent success as a balladeer hasn't buried his roots in hearty black pop, as evidenced by this infectious exercise in smooth funk. Synthesizer, hand-claps and Graham's sly bass syncopations keep the pace while the singer still adds enough of a croon to his delivery to keep female listeners swooning".

== Track listing ==
=== 1982 releases ===
12" vinyl

- US: Warner Bros. / PRO-A-1046

Side one
No.	Title	Length
1.	"Sooner or Later"	5:10

Side two
No.	Title	Length
1.	"Sooner or Later" (Instrumental)	4:59

12" vinyl

- UK: Warner Bros. / K17925T

Side one
No.	Title	Length
1.	"Sooner or Later" (Instrumental)	N/A

Side two
No.	Title	Length
1.	"Sooner or Later" (Vocal)	N/A
2.	"One in a Million"	N/A

== Personnel ==
- Composer, producer, arrangement: Larry Graham
- Executive Producer: Ron Nadel

== Chart performance ==
Chart (1982)	Peak position
US Billboard Hot Dance Music/Club Play	17
US Billboard Black Singles	27
UK Singles Chart	54
