= 5 Years Behind =

Studio album by Thick
- Released: March 6, 2020
- Studio: Studio G, Brooklyn, New York, New York City, US
- Genre: Pop punk
- Language: English
- Label: Epitaph
- Producer: Joel Hamilton

Thick chronology
| Would You Rather? (2020) | 5 Years Behind (2020) | Happy Now (2022) |

5 Years Behind is the debut full-length studio album by American pop punk band Thick.

== Reception ==
According to the review aggregator Metacritic, 5 Years Behind received "generally favorable reviews" based on a weighted average score of 77 out of 100 from five critic scores. Natalia Barr of Consequence of Sound scored this album a B, comparing the band favorably to Blink-182, summing up that this music is "subverting pop punk stereotypes by singing about their own experiences as women in the music scene and beyond, while still using the same drum patterns, chord progressions, and anthemic sing-alongs that brought the genre so many adoring fans in the first place". At Paste, Natalia Keogan gave this album 7.8 out of 10, praising the band's exploration of contemporary femininity and ending that the group's criticism of patriarchy via "angry, catchy punk is as viable as ever". Under the Radar's Andy Von Pip scored 5 Years Behind an 8 out of 10, calling it "an album imbued with a swashbuckling attitude, that fizzes with passion employing empathy, charm, humor, and, where necessary, rage".

== Track listing ==
1. "5 Years Behind" – 3:04
2. "Sleeping Through the Weekend" – 2:37
3. "Bumming Me Out" – 2:43
4. "Fake News" – 0:48
5. "Home" – 2:57
6. "Mansplain" – 2:08
7. "WHUB" – 3:12
8. "Won't Back Down" – 3:55
9. "Can't Be Friends" – 2:09
10. "Your Mom" – 1:24
11. "Party with Me" – 2:11
12. "5:00 AM" – 2:43

== Personnel ==
Thick

- Kate Black – bass guitar, synthesizer, vocals, guitar on "5 Years Behind and "Bumming Me Out", piano on "Won't Back Down", art direction, design
- Shari Page – drums, vocals, art direction, design
- Nikki Sisti – guitar, vocals, art direction, design

Additional personnel

- Francisco Botero – engineering
- Devin Bristol Shaw – cover photography, back cover photography
- Rachel Cabitt – cover photography
- Mike Duesenberg – cover collage
- Joel Hamilton – percussion, guitar, engineering, mixing, production
- Michael Jinno – engineering
- Jason Link – artwork

== See also ==
- 2020 in American music
- List of 2020 albums
