= Are You Happy Now? (disambiguation) =

"Are You Happy Now?" is a 2003 song by Michelle Branch

Are You Happy Now or Are You Happy Now? may also refer to:

- Are You Happy Now? (album), a 2008 album by Aya Kamiki
- "Are You Happy Now?", a 2012 episode from season 8 of SpongeBob SquarePants
- a 1962 song by The Four Seasons
- a 1983 song by Poison Girls
- a 1988 song by The Charlottes
- a 1992 song by Richard Shindell
- a 2001 song by Sahara Hotnights
- a 2002 song by Shannon Lawson
- a 2011 song by Megan and Liz
- a 2011 song by Miss Li
- a 2017 song by Rascal Flatts
- a 2022 album by Jensen McRae

== See also ==
- Are You Happy? (disambiguation)
- Happy Now (disambiguation)
