= Willie Sparks =

American drummer

- Died: May 2020
- Genre: Musician
- Occupations: Drums, vocals
- Formerly of: Hot Chocolate aka Hot Choc’let , Graham Central Station

Willie “Wild” Sparks was a drummer for the band Graham Central Station and worked as a session musician in the 1970s and 80s.

== Background ==
A founding member of Graham Central Station, Willie Sparks was a member of the Oakland band, Hot Chocolate. He has also sung vocals and played drums for other artists, including Sly & The Family Stone and Elton John.

== Career ==
In the early 1970s, Willie Sparks and Hershall Kennedy did some work with the group, Little Sister.

Sparks was part of an ensemble called Hot Choc’let aka Hot Cocolate that was set up by Larry Graham. Patrice Banks, David Vega, Robert Sam, and Hershell Kennedy were also members. This all came about when Larry Graham was still in Sly & the Family Stone. Larry Graham just wanted to work as the group's composer and producer. But one night after joining the band on stage, things clicked well and Graham joined the band, replacing the original bass player. The band's name was then changed to Graham Central Station, and Graham quit Sly & the Family Stone.

He played on the debut album, Graham Central Station that was released in 1974.

Sparks played on Sly Stone's High on You album that was released in 1975.

== Later years ==
For a period of 15 years, Sparks was homeless off and on, living in the San Francisco, California area.

== Death ==
Willie Sparks died on May 15, 2020.
