= Ain't No 'Bout-A-Doubt It =

Studio album by Graham Central Station
- Released: July 1975
- Recorded: 1975
- Studios: Wally Heider, San Francisco, California
- Genres: Soul; funk
- Label: Warner Bros.
- Producer: Larry Graham

Graham Central Station chronology
Release Yourself (1974)	Ain't No 'Bout-A-Doubt It (1975)	Mirror (1976)

Singles from Ain't No 'Bout-A-Doubt It
- 1. "Your Love" Released: May 1975; 2. "It's Alright" Released: October 1975; 3. "The Jam" Released: February 1976

Professional ratings
Review scores
Source	Rating
AllMusic	3/5 stars

Ain't No 'Bout-A-Doubt It is the third album by Graham Central Station. Released in 1975, the album peaked at number four on the Billboard Top Soul Albums chart. The single "Your Love" was a number-one hit on the Soul Singles chart.

== Track listing ==
All songs written by Larry Graham except where indicated.

Side One
No.	Title	Writer(s)	Length
1.	"The Jam"		8:14
2.	"Your Love"		3:22
3.	"It's Alright"		3:52
4.	"I Can't Stand the Rain"	Ann Peebles, Don Bryant, Bernard "Bernie" Miller	6:04

Side Two
No.	Title	Length
5.	"It Ain't Nothing but a Warner Bros. Party"	6:04
6.	"Ole Smokey"	3:18
7.	"Easy Rider"	2:57
8.	"Water"	4:28
9.	"Luckiest People"	3:47

== Personnel ==
Graham Central Station

- Larry Graham – bass, synthesizer (3), drums (4, 9), organ (9), clavinet (9), tympani (9), lead vocals (2, 3, 6, 7, 9), vocals (1, 5, 8) backing vocals (2–4, 7, 9)
- Hershall "Happiness" Kennedy – clavinet (1–8), synthesizer (2), trumpet solo (6), vocals (1, 5, 8, 9), background vocals (2–4, 6, 7)
- Manuel "The Deacon" Kellough – drums (1–3, 5–8), vocals (1)
- David "Dynamite" Vega – guitar (1–5, 7, 9), acoustic guitar (6, 8), vocals (1)
- Robert "Butch" Sam – organ (1–8), piano (2, 5, 6, 7, 9), vocals (1, 5, 8, 9), background vocals (2, 3, 4, 6, 7)
- Patryce "Choc'Let" Banks – drum programming [funk box] (1, 3, 6, 7), lead vocals (2, 4, 7), vocals (1, 5, 8, 9), background vocals (2, 3, 4, 6, 7)

== Charts ==
Chart (1975)	Peak position
Billboard Pop Albums	22
Billboard Top Soul Albums	4

=== Singles ===
Year	Single	Chart positions		
Year	Single	US Pop	US Soul	US Dance
1975	"It's Alright"	92	19	4
1975	"Your Love"	38	1	-
1976	"The Jam"	63	15	-
