= Dennis Marcellino =

- Born: Dennis Joseph Marcellino; January 17, 1948; San Francisco, United States
- Died: May 21, 2022 (aged 74)
- Occupations: Musician, Vocalist, Songwriter, Author, Engineer, Philosopher, Psychologist, Theologian
- Instruments: Saxophone, Flute, Clarinet, Guitar, Bass

Dennis Marcellino (January 17, 1948 - May 21, 2022) was an American musician, speaker, and author of psychology, philosophy, theology, and politics. He was a member of several prominent bands during the mid-20th century, including The Tokens, Sly and The Family Stone, The Elvin Bishop Group and Rubicon. He had a number of CD releases under his name, including a jazz album with Mario Stefani titled An Evening to Remember.

== Career ==
According to one of Marcellino's books, he recognized that music was a way to tap the inner depths of the human soul, which he was totally fascinated with. He had been living a self-centered and materialistic lifestyle focusing on making money, having fun, following his impulses, and being successful by making it big in the world. But, this still left a certain emptiness inside. "The hippie movement made me feel there was something more important that I needed to know," explains Marcellino. "I wanted to break with convention and make truth, wisdom, peace and love – as opposed to success, money, vanity and competition – the top priorities in my life."

Along the way he attempted to fill the void with 21 different approaches to lifestyle, truth, problem solving and personal growth, including most of the major and experimental forms of psychology, eastern religion, Utopianism, experimenting with drugs and alcohol, various new-age involvements, Scientology and secular-humanism. He finally found the deep fulfillment that he was looking for in Christianity in 1982.

Between 1965 and 1989, Marcellino mixed his music career with time in college. He attended seven different colleges obtaining credits, certificates and degrees in a range of subjects, including engineering, psychology, philosophy, theology and business.

== Music history ==
Dennis Marcellino’s history in the music business has primarily been with him playing the sax, flute, guitar, and bass, as well as being a vocalist, composer and arranger. He is a former member of The Tokens (1985–1993), Sly & The Family Stone (1974–1976), The Elvin Bishop Group (1971–1973) and Rubicon (1976–1980). With these groups he recorded 10 albums. As a solo artist he had the #1 selling cassette in the Northwest in 1992 & 1993 called "It's Christmas" and the following solo CD releases: "Daddy's Home", "New Beginning", "An Evening To Remember", "Tenderly", "The Spirit of Christmas" and "Onward & Upward". Marcellino also held down #1 spots in the charts at mp3.com, receiving over 350,000 downloads and listens.

His television credits as a "Special Guest Star" or guest include American Bandstand, Merv Griffin, Midnight Special, Cal Jam 2 Special, Truth Or Consequences, March Of Dimes Telethon, Throb, 2 On The Town, PBS special "Let's Rock Tonight", CNN Headline News, Showibiz Today, The Tracey Ullman Show (2 shows, including the sketch of the year), Living The Life (ABC Family Channel, CBN) and a number of Good Morning shows in various cities.

While living in the Los Angeles area in the 1980s, he accrued film credits as a producer, writer, arranger, musician and engineer in films that included Talia Shire, Vic Tayback, Ursula Andress, Marcello Mastroianni, Peter Ustinov, Nancy Kwan, Victor Buono, Donald Pleasence, John Carradine, Leslie Caron, Catherine Bach, and Michelle Phillips. He also sang the lead on 2 songs (including the opening) in "Sweet Bird of Youth" (1989) starring Elizabeth Taylor and Mark Harmon.

== Discography ==
- 2015 Dennis Marcellino (Lighthouse) – "X-Factor"
- 2011 Dennis Marcellino (Lighthouse) – "Onward & Upward"
- 2010 Dennis Marcellino (Lighthouse) – "Its Christmas"
- 2009 Rubicon (Renaissance) – 2 CD re-release of "Rubicon" and "America Dreams"
- 2009 Sly & The Family Stone (Epic) – "The Essential Sly & The Family Stone"
- 2002 Dennis Marcellino (Lighthouse) – "The Spirit of Christmas"
- 2001 Dennis Marcellino/Mark Stefani (Lighthouse) – "Tenderly"
- 1999 Dennis Marcellino (Lighthouse) – "New Beginning"
- 1996 Dennis Marcellino/Mark Stefani (Sugo) – "An Evening To Remember"
- 1996 Horn Rock Bands (Sony) – Wrote and played the horn parts for "Rock My Soul"
- 1996 Rubicon (Sony) – "Cal Jam 2" (CBS album reissue on Sony CD)
- 1996 Mike Pinera (M&E) – "In The Garden of Eden"
- 1994 The Elvin Bishop Group (Sony) – "Tulsa Shuffle: Best of Elvin Bishop"
- 1994 Dennis Marcellino (Lighthouse) – "Daddy's Home"
- 1992 Dennis Marcellino (Lighthouse) – "It's Christmas" (Cassette single)
- 1988 The Tokens (RCA) – "Re-Doo-Wopp"
- 1985 Kyle Henderson Band (Kerygma/Sparrow Records) – "More Than The Look of Love"
- 1983 Stargazer (Moonshine Records) – "Phone Home"
- 1982 Dennis & The Menaces (Lighthouse) – "All The Way"
- 1981 Dennis & Jerry Marcellino (Valentine card) – "Be Mine"
- 1980 Daze (Lighthouse) – "Let Yourself Go"
- 1979 Rubicon (20th Century Fox) – "America Dreams"
- 1978 Rubicon (20th Century Fox) – "Rubicon"
- 1978 Rubicon (Columbia) – "Cal Jam 2"
- 1978 Mike Bloomfield & Friends (Clouds) – "Count Talent & The Originals"
- 1977 Graham Central Station (Warner Brothers) "Now Do U Wanta Dance"
- 1976 Sly & The Family Stone (Epic) – "Heard Ya Missed Me Well I'm Back"
- 1975 Sly & The Family Stone (Epic) – "High on You"
- 1972 The Elvin Bishop Group (Epic) – "Rock My Soul"
- 1969 Creation (with Leon Patillo) (Studio 10 Records) – "This Is The Beginning"

He also worked as a musician or vocalist with Sha Na Na, Rare Earth, Otis Day & The Knights, The Coasters, The Drifters, Danny & The Juniors, etc. and once was musical director for: The Shirelles, The Drifters, and Fabian.

His studio experience includes over 50 albums and singles in the Billboard Top 100, including what is mentioned above plus Billy Preston, Leon Russell, Lawrence Welk, and various Motown recordings.

== Books authored ==
- 2013 How a LITERAL Reading of Genesis 1 is Proven by Modern Science and Hebrew Scholars
- 2011 THE Solutions (Simple, practical solutions to the biggest personal and societal problems)
- 2009 THE PROOF that God exists and the Bible is true
- 2008 How To Directly Experience God (a step by step guide)
- 2008 The Plague of Liberalism
- 2007 Why Are We Here? Workbook
- 2007 Addiction Free Forever Workbook
- 2006 Addiction Free Forever
- 1996 Why Are We Here?
- 1988 Sweeping It Under The Drug
