= Wear This Ring (with Love) =

1971 single by The Detroit Emeralds

Single by The Detroit Emeralds

from the album Do Me Right
- B-side: "I Bet You Get the One (Who Loves You)"
- Released: June 1971
- Genre: Soul
- Length: 3:13
- Label: Westbound 181
- Songwriter(s): Abrim Tilmon, James Mitchell
- Producer(s): Katouzzion

The Detroit Emeralds singles chronology
"Do Me Right" (1971)	"Wear This Ring (with Love)" (1971)	"You Want It, You Got It" (1971)

"Wear This Ring (with Love)" is a song written by Abrim Tilmon and James Mitchell and performed by The Detroit Emeralds. It reached #18 on the R&B chart and #91 on the Billboard Hot 100 in 1971. The song was featured on their 1971 album, Do Me Right.

The song was produced by Katouzzion and arranged by Abrim Tilmon and Sonny Sanders.
