= I'm in Love with You (album) =

Studio album by the Detroit Emeralds
- Released: 1973
- Genre: Soul, funk
- Label: Westbound 2018
- Producer: Katouzzion

The Detroit Emeralds chronology
You Want It, You Got It (1972)	I'm in Love with You (1973)	Abe, James and Ivory (1973)

Singles from I'm in Love with You
- 1. "You're Gettin' a Little Too Smart"/"Heaven Couldn't Be Like This" Released: May 1973; 2. "I Think of You"/"So Long" Released: July 1973

Professional ratings
Review scores
Source	Rating
AllMusic	2/5 stars
Christgau's Record Guide	B

I'm in Love with You is the third studio album by American vocal group the Detroit Emeralds, released in 1973 through Westbound Records.

== Commercial performance ==
The album peaked at No. 27 on the R&B albums chart. It also reached No. 181 on the Billboard 200. The album features the single "You're Gettin' a Little Too Smart", which peaked at No. 10 on the Hot Soul Singles chart.

== Track listing ==
All tracks are written by Abrim Tilmon, except where noted.

Side one
No.	Title	Length
1.	"Shake Your Head"	3:01
2.	"So Long"	6:03
3.	"You're Gettin' a Little Too Smart"	3:39
4.	"I Think of You" (Abril Tilmon, James Mitchell)	4:25
5.	"You Control Me"	3:28

Side two
No.	Title	Length
6.	"Whatcha Gonna Wear Tomorrow"	4:14
7.	"Heaven Couldn't Be Like That"	2:22
8.	"Without You Baby"	1:34
9.	"I'm in Love with You"	6:19
10.	"My Dreams Have Got the Best of Me"	2:48

== Personnel ==
- David Krieger - art direction
- Joel Brodsky - photography
- Mia Krinsky - co-ordination
- Bob Scerbo - production supervision
- Abrim Tillmon - arrangement, songwriting
- James Mitchell - arrangement, songwriting, production (credited as Katouzzion)

== Charts ==
Album

Chart (1973)	Peaks
U.S. Billboard Top LPs	181
U.S. Billboard Top Soul LPs	27

Singles

Year	Single	Peaks	
Year	Single	US	US R&B
1973	"You're Gettin' a Little Too Smart"	101	10
