= Freedom for the Stallion =

1973 debut album by The Hues Corporation

Studio album by The Hues Corporation
- Released: December 7, 1973
- Recorded: 1973; RCA's Music Center Of The World, Hollywood, California
- Genres: R&B, disco, soul, pop
- Length: 32:46
- Label: RCA Records
- Producer: John Florez

The Hues Corporation chronology
| Freedom for the Stallion (1973) | Rockin' Soul (1974) |

Freedom for the Stallion is the debut album by American pop and soul trio The Hues Corporation, released in 1973.

The album includes the original recording of "Rock The Boat". A later re-mix version of this recording became one of the first disco hits in 1974 and reached No. 1 on the Billboard Hot 100 in the United States.

The title track, "Freedom for the Stallion" was also a minor hit. This Allen Toussaint song had been recorded earlier by Lee Dorsey in 1971. Later versions of "Freedom for the Stallion" include recordings by Three Dog Night on their 1972 album Seven Separate Fools, Boz Scaggs on his 1972 album "My Time", The Oak Ridge Boys on their 1974 self-titled Columbia Records debut, a 1974 single by Canadian pop-rock band Edward Bear (#20 Can), and a 2006 recording by Toussaint and Elvis Costello on the album The River in Reverse.

Professional ratings
Review scores
| Source | Rating |
|---|---|
| AllMusic | link |
| Christgau's Record Guide | C |

== Track listing ==
1. "Bound on a Reason" - (Michael Jarrett) 3:15
2. "Off My Cloud" - (Wally Holmes) 4:16
3. "All Goin' Down Together" - (Michael Jarrett) 2:51
4. "Rock the Boat" - (Wally Holmes) 3:22
5. "Freedom for the Stallion" - (Allen Toussaint) 4:00
6. "The Family" - (John Hurley, Ronnie Wilkins) 3:09
7. "Go To The Poet" - (Wally Holmes) 2:51
8. "Salvation Lady" (1-3-5) - (John Hurley, Ronnie Wilkins) 3:18
9. "Live a Lie" - (Wally Holmes) 2:13
10. "Miracle Maker (Sweet Soul Shaker)" - (Barry Mann, Cynthia Weil) 3:16

== Personnel ==
- St. Clair Lee, Fleming Williams, Hubert Ann Kelley - Vocals
- Joe Sample - Keyboards
- Hal Blaine, Jim Gordon, Ron Tutt, Bobby Perez - Drums
- Wilton Felder (The Crusaders), David Hungate, Joe Osborn - Bass guitar
- Al Casey, Dennis Budimir, Larry Carlton, Louis Shelton - Guitar
- William E. Green - Baritone saxophone
- Charles Loper, Lew McCreary - Trombone
- Bud Brisbois, Chuck Findley, Paul Hubinon - Trumpet
- Gary Coleman - Percussion
- Chino Valdes - Congas
- Edgar Lustgarten - Cello
- Harry Bluestone, Israel Baker, James Getzoff, Sidney Sharp - Violin
- David Schwartz - Viola
- D'Arneill Pershing, Gene Page, Perry Botkin, Jr., Tom Sellers - arrangements

== Charts ==
=== Album ===
| Year | Chart | Position |
|---|---|---|
| 1973 | US Top Soul LPs | 59 |
| 1974 | US Top LPs | 20 |

=== Single ===
| Year | Single | Chart | Position |
|---|---|---|---|
| 1973 | "Freedom for the Stallion" | Billboard Hot 100 | 63 |
| 1973 | "Freedom for the Stallion" | Canada | 86 |
| 1974 | "Rock the Boat" | Hot Soul Singles | 3 |
| 1974 | "Rock the Boat" | Billboard Hot 100 | 1 |
| 1974 | "Rock the Boat" | Hot Dance/Disco | 5 |
| 1974 | "Rock the Boat" | Canada | 1 |
