= Mario Stefani =

Italian poet (1938–2001)

- Born: 1938; Venice, Italy
- Died: 4 March 2001 (aged 62–63); Venice, Italy
- Occupation: Poet

Mario Stefani (1938 – 4 March 2001) was an Italian poet.

Stefani was openly gay, and his poetry was some of the first Italian poetry to explore homosexuality. A selection of his poetry was translated into English by Anthony Reid and published in 1982 as No Other Gods.

Alongside his poetry, Stefani taught classes in literature and wrote literary and art reviews. He also presented a popular unscripted television show.

In 2001, graffiti began appearing around Venice, featuring a quote of Stefani's: "Loneliness is not being alone; it's loving others to no avail". A month later, Stefani hanged himself in his kitchen. His $1 million estate was left to a fruit vendor whose young daughter had inspired his work.

Details of his life were retold in John Berendt's 2005 book The City of Falling Angels.
