= The Hues Corporation =

American pop and soul trio

- The Hues Corporation in 1970: Karl Russell, H. Ann Kelley and St. Clair Lee (left to right)

Background information
- Origin: Santa Monica, California, United States
- Genres: Pop, soul, disco, R&B
- Years active: 1969 - c.1980 (reunited in the 1990s)
- Labels: RCA, Warner Bros.
- Past members: St. Clair Lee; Fleming Williams; Hubert Ann Kelley; Tommy Brown; Karl Russell; Kenny James

The Hues Corporation was an American pop and soul trio, formed in Santa Monica, California, in 1969. They are best known for their 1974 single "Rock the Boat", which sold more than two million copies, hit No. 1, and helped establish the disco sound.

== Group name and background ==
Before achieving mainstream success they were the opening act for a list of headliners that included Frank Sinatra, Milton Berle, Nancy Sinatra, and Glen Campbell. The original band had a lineup of three singers and three sidemen. The sidemen were: Joey Rivera from the Checkmates; Monti Lawston; and Bob "Bullet" Bailey, formerly of the Leaves. Bailey, Rivera, and Lawston left the band to form Goodstuff.

The group's name was a pun on the Howard Hughes Corporation, with the "hue" being a synonym of "color". The band's members at the time of their first album were St. Clair Lee (born Bernard St. Clair Lee, April 24, 1944, San Francisco, California; died March 8, 2011), Fleming Williams (born December 26, 1943, Flint, Michigan; died February 15, 1998) and Hubert Ann Kelley (born April 24, 1947, Fairfield, Alabama; died July 20, 2023). The original choice for the group's name was The Children of Howard Hughes, which their record label turned down.

== Career ==
The group was formed in 1969. Songwriter Wally Holmes founded the group with his friend Bernard St. Clair Lee. Female singer H. Ann Kelley was found at a talent show in Los Angeles. As a result of notices placed in southern California record stores, Karl Russell turned up. They recorded a single "Goodfootin'" / "We're Keepin' Our Business" that was released by Liberty Records in 1970. It did not chart.

Still with Karl Russell, the group had their first big break in 1972, when they were invited to appear in the blaxploitation film Blacula, starring William Marshall. They were also asked to record three songs for the film's soundtrack: "There He Is Again", "What the World Knows", and "I'm Gonna Catch You". After their participation in the Blacula project, Karl Russell was replaced by Fleming Williams and the group signed with RCA Records; their second single for the label, "Freedom for the Stallion", from the album of the same name, became a moderate hit, reaching No. 63 on the Billboard Hot 100 chart. The third single from the album, "Rock the Boat", became a No. 1 hit on the Billboard chart and the group's signature song. The bass player on the session for "Rock the Boat" was Wilton Felder, not James Jamerson as previously reported. "Rock the Boat" was written by Holmes, who also wrote the Blacula songs, and was released in the U.S. in February 1974 and in the UK in July of that year. It went to No. 1 for one week in the U.S. and No. 6 for two weeks in the UK, staying for 18 weeks in the U.S. chart with a gold disc awarded by the RIAA on 24 June 1974. The track sold well over two million copies, and is considered one of the earliest disco songs. Some authorities proclaim it to be the first disco song to hit No. 1, while others give that distinction to "Love's Theme" by The Love Unlimited Orchestra, a chart-topper from earlier in 1974.

After the success of "Rock the Boat", the Hues Corporation's other charted singles on the Billboard Hot 100 included "Rockin' Soul" (1974, No. 18), "Love Corporation" (1975, No. 62), and "I Caught Your Act" (1977, No. 92).

The group was unable to duplicate the success of their earlier hits and disbanded sometime around 1980. Whereas some sources claim the year of disbanding as early as 1978, archive footage of a television special for the Chilean TV in 1979 promoting their performance at the Viña del Mar International Song Festival demonstrates otherwise. Furthermore, in 1980 the Hues Corporation released one last single in the US and a sixth album in at least New Zealand, Argentina and South Africa. With the renewed popularity of disco music in the 1990s, the group reunited for tour dates and special events, including the PBS special Get Down Tonight: The Disco Explosion.

== Group members ==
Karl Russell was replaced by Fleming Williams, who sang the male lead part on "Rock the Boat". Williams left not long after its recording.

Williams was initially replaced by Tommy Brown. In an interview with Gary James, St. Clair Lee said that after some time Williams was brought back into the group and in turn replaced Tommy Brown.

Around 1975, Karl Russell rejoined the band, taking over the role of lead singer after Fleming Williams had left for good.

Around 1979, Kenny James took over as lead singer from Karl Russell. James can be seen in the Chilean TV-footage from 1979 promoting their performance at the Viña del Mar International Song Festival and is also shown on the cover of the group's last album, Boogie Me, Move Me from 1980.

Hubert Ann Kelley later left the group to become a minister.

In later years, circa the 1990s, St. Clair Lee revived the group and recruited Bruce Glover and Elaine Woodard as the new members.

Fleming Wiliams died in the 1990s. Many sources claim that the date of his death was September 1992, but other sources claim he died in February 1998. According to the Social Security Death Index, Fleming Williams died on February 15, 1998. His death has been attributed to a "long illness", although many have also alluded to a long struggle with drugs. According to The New McCree Theatre in Williams' home town Flint, which in 2011 put on the play Rock The Boat: The Fleming Williams Story co-written by Williams' mother, Fleming Williams committed suicide in 1998.

Founding member St. Clair Lee died on March 8, 2011, in Lake Elsinore, California. He is said to have died from natural causes at the age of 66, as written in the Los Angeles Times obituaries in March. He was survived by his mother, sons, and sister.

Original member Hubert Ann Kelley died in Los Angeles on July 20, 2023, at the age of 76.

== Discography ==
=== Albums ===
==== Studio albums ====
Year	Album	Label	Peak chart positions		
Year	Album	Label	US	US R&B	CAN
1973	Freedom for the Stallion	RCA Victor	20	59	10
1974	Rockin' Soul	RCA Victor	147	40	—
1975	Love Corporation	RCA Victor	—	—	—
1977	I Caught Your Act (Note: Released outside the US with different cover artwork as Not Too Shabby on RCA Victor.)	Warner Bros.	—	—	—
1978	Your Place or Mine	Warner Bros.	—	—	—
1980	Boogie Me, Move Me (Note: Released with different cover artwork in Argentina (as Bailemos El Boogie).)		—	—	—
"—" denotes releases that did not chart or were not released in that territory.

The albums Rockin' Soul and Love Corporation were reissued in 2018 by Dutton Vocalion in hybrid multi-channel SACD format.

==== Compilation albums ====
- Best of the Hues Corporation – RCA Victor (1977)
- Rock the Boat – Collectables (1991)
- Rock the Boat – The Best of the Hues Corporation – RCA (1993)
- The Masters – Eagle (1997)
- The Very Best of the Hues Corporation – Camden (1998)

=== Singles ===
Year	Single	Peak chart positions													Certifications
Year	Single	AUS	BE (FLA)	BE (WA)	CAN	CAN AC	GER	IRE	NL	NZ	UK	US	US AC	US R&B	Certifications
1970	"Goodfootin'"	—	—	—	—	—	—	—	—	—	—	—	—	—	
1972	"There He Is Again"	—	—	—	—	—	—	—	—	—	—	—	—	—	
1973	"Freedom for the Stallion"	—	—	—	86	16	—	—	—	—	—	63	9	—	
1973	"Miracle Maker (Sweet Soul Shaker)"	—	—	—	—	—	—	—	—	—	—	—	—	—	
1974	"Rock the Boat"	18	6	2	1	1	7	9	4	8	6	1	12	2	BPI: Silver
1974	"Rockin' Soul"	71	22	—	33	40	32	—	9	—	24	18	—	6	
1975	"Love Corporation"	—	—	31	79	—	—	—	26	39	55 (Note: Chart position is from the official UK "Breakers List".)	62	—	15	
1975	"I'll Take a Melody"	—	—	—	—	—	—	—	—	—	54	—	—	—	
1975	"One Good Night Together"	—	—	—	—	—	—	—	—	—	—	—	—	—	
1975	"You Showed Me What Love Is"	—	—	—	—	—	—	—	—	—	—	—	—	—	
1977	"I Caught Your Act"	—	—	—	—	—	—	—	—	6	—	92	—	61	
1977	"Telegram of Love"	—	—	—	—	—	—	—	—	—	—	—	—	—	
1978	"Give Me Everything"	—	—	—	—	—	—	—	—	—	—	—	—	—	
1978	"With All My Love and Affection"	—	—	—	—	—	—	—	—	—	—	—	—	—	
1980	"Something in Return"	—	—	—	—	—	—	—	—	—	—	—	—	—	
1980	"Boogie Me, Move Me" (New Zealand-only release)	—	—	—	—	—	—	—	—	—	—	—	—	—	
1982	"Sugar Town" (Japan-only release)	—	—	—	—	—	—	—	—	—	—	—	—	—	
"—" denotes releases that did not chart or were not released in that territory.

== See also ==
- List of Billboard number-one singles
- List of artists who reached number one in the United States
- List of Billboard number-one dance club songs
- List of artists who reached number one on the U.S. Dance Club Songs chart
