= My Radio Sure Sounds Good to Me =

Studio album by Larry Graham and Graham Central Station
- Released: May 1978
- Recorded: 1978
- Genre: Funk
- Label: Warner Bros.
- Producer: Larry Graham, Benny Golson

Larry Graham and Graham Central Station chronology
Now Do U Wanta Dance (1977)	My Radio Sure Sounds Good to Me (1978)	Star Walk (1979)

My Radio Sure Sounds Good to Me is album by Larry Graham & Graham Central Station. Released in 1978, the record marked the first time that Graham called his band Larry Graham & Graham Central Station (as opposed to simply Graham Central Station). The album peaked at number eighteen on the Billboard Top Soul Albums chart.

== Critical reception ==
Professional ratings
Review scores
Source	Rating
AllMusic	3/5 stars

Alex Henderson of AllMusic said, "Golson handles most of the LP's horn and string arrangements, but his jazz background doesn't make its presence felt—not even in a subtle way. Graham hired Golson to co-produce an R&B project, and he did what he was paid to do. My Radio Sure Sounds Good to Me isn't GCS' most essential album, but it's a solid effort that is easily recommended to anyone with a taste for gutsy, horn-powered 1970s funk."

Paul McGrath of The Globe and Mail wrote, "Graham's lengthy commitment to good music disguised as silly froth continues with My Radio Sure Sounds Good to Me, a collection of tunes for all types of dancers, which avoids both ponderous preaching and the predictable homogenized disco beat."

== Track listing ==
All songs written by Larry Graham.

1. "Pow" 4:42
2. "My Radio Sure Sounds Good to Me" 3:57
3. "Is It Love?" 6:37
4. "Boogie Witcha, Baby" 3:47
5. "It's the Engine in Me" 5:16
6. "Turn It Out" 4:37
7. "Mr. Friend" 3:39
8. "Are You Happy?" 4:53

== Personnel ==
- Larry Graham – bass, lead and backing vocals, clavinet, guitar
- Gaylord "Flash" Birch – drums
- Gemi Taylor – guitar
- Nate Ginsberg – keyboards
- Robert "Butch" Sam – keyboards, backing vocals, organ, piano
- Tina Graham – backing vocals

== Charts ==
Chart (1978)	Peak position
Billboard Pop Albums	105
Billboard Top Soul Albums	18

=== Singles ===
Year	Single	Chart positions
Year	Single	US Soul
1978	"Is It Love?"	65
1978	"My Radio Sure Sounds Good to Me"	18
