= St. Clair Lee =

American singer

- Born: Bernard St. Clair Lee; April 24, 1944; San Francisco, California, U.S.
- Died: March 8, 2011 (aged 66) Lake Elsinore, California, U.S.
- Genres: R&B, soul, pop
- Occupation: Singer
- Years active: 1968–2011
- Label: RCA Records
- Formerly of: Brothers and Sisters, The Children of Howard Hughes, The Hues Corporation, The Hues Corporation (reformed version)

Bernard St. Clair Lee (April 24, 1944 – March 8, 2011) was an American rhythm and blues vocalist with the band The Hues Corporation, which had a top ten record on the R&B and pop music charts called "Rock the Boat". The single went to number one in 1974 and sold over two million copies.

== Background ==
=== Early life ===
Lee was born Bernard St. Clair Lee in San Francisco, California. It has often been erroneously stated that his full birth name was Bernard St. Clair Lee Calhoun Henderson, but he asserts in an interview that, while his ancestry included Calhouns and Hendersons, neither of these were ever part of his official name. When he was born, someone at the hospital mistakenly wrote "St. Clair" instead of his originally intended name, Sinclair. When he was a young man, he found out that the American Indian side of his family were Blackfoot that had migrated down from Canada to Oklahoma. It was this discovery that led him to decide to wear his trademark headband. He attended Santa Monica College.

=== Personal life ===
In the late 1960s he was a surfer and was friends with Wally Holmes, a trumpeter, songwriter and surfer residing in Los Angeles who would later be instrumental in his music career.

He and his wife Arlene had one son. He also had two step-children. He lived in Lake Elsinore, California.

== Career ==
=== Late 1960s to late 1970s ===
Prior to the formation of the Hues Corporation, he was the lead singer of a group called Brothers and Sisters which was formed by Wally Holmes in 1968. Brothers and Sisters were a group with two male and two female singers. Holmes hoped to book them into Las Vegas clubs with an eight-member backing group. The group had the wrong combination of singers and broke up. A trio was formed and it was named the Children of Howard Hughes which was renamed as The Hues Corporation.

The Hues Corporation was formed in 1969, in Santa Monica and began playing frequently in Palm Springs and Las Vegas. In Vegas, Lee worked at Circus Circus. During this time, he worked on the same stages with Frank Sinatra, Milton Berle, Nancy Sinatra and Glen Campbell. When the band secured a record deal, Lee started to record and tour with the band regularly. Before their first big hit, they also contributed to the soundtrack of the blaxploitation film Blacula. The success of The Hues Corporation is greatly tied to the musicianship Lee worked with on their biggest selling album Freedom For The Stallion. In 1973, he was in the studio with some of RCA's best talent, including: Jim Gordon, Hal Blaine, and Dennis Budimir, as well as Larry Carlton, Joe Sample, and Wilton Felder of The Crusaders – and many others.

Touring with the band took Lee to Europe, South America, The Far East, Australia and New Zealand. He performed for Queen Elizabeth at the same event with Dionne Warwick. He performed with The Jackson 5 in Radio City Music Hall. Lee also shared bills with The Commodores, The Spinners, Dolly Parton and Dinah Shore. After a second moderate success ("Rockin' Soul") with the band and a few more records, The Hues Corporation disbanded sometime around 1980. Whereas some sources claim the year of disbanding as early as 1978, archive footage of a television special for the Chilean TV in 1979 promoting their performance at the Viña del Mar International Song Festival proves the opposite. Furthermore, in 1980 the Hues Corporation released one last single in the US and a sixth album in at least New Zealand, Argentina and South Africa.

Professionally he has also been referred to as Bernard "St. Clair Lee" Henderson and Bernard Henderson.

=== Later years ===
Lee was responsible for the reactivation of the group and the recruiting of two new members, Elaine Woodard and Bruce Glover. He continued to tour and perform with the band up until his death.

== Death ==
Lee died at his home in Lake Elsinore, aged 66. According to a coroners news release, he was found unresponsive in his home at around 8:30 am, March 8, 2011. His death was due to natural causes.

He was survived by his wife, sister, mother, a son and two stepsons. A memorial service was held at the Palisades Lutheran Church, 15905 Sunset Blvd., Pacific Palisades at 11 am on March 19. Former bandmate Hubert Ann Kelley delivered the eulogy.

== Legacy ==
The song "Rock the Boat", by The Hues Corporation, has been included on hundreds of soundtracks and compilation albums since the early 1990s.

== Discography ==
=== With The Hues Corporation ===
- 1978: Your Place or Mine - Warner Bros. BSK 3196
- 1977: I Caught Your Act - Warner Bros. BS 3043
- 1977: The Best of the Hues Corporation RCA Victor APL1 2408
- 1976: Rock The Boat - RCA Victor
- 1975: Love Corporation - RCA Victor APL 0938
- 1974: Rockin' Soul - RCA Victor APL 0175
- 1973: Freedom for the Stallion - RCA APL1 0323

=== Compilation - various artists ===
- 1984: Ultra Dance - RCA AFLI-5322
