= Feel the Need in Me =

Single by the Detroit Emeralds

from the album You Want It, You Got It
- B-side: "There's a Love for Me Somewhere"
- Released: October 1972
- Genre: Soul
- Length: 3:21 (single edit); 3:41 (album version); 7:06 (1977 version)
- Label: Westbound 209; Westbound 55401
- Songwriter: Abrim Tilmon
- Producer: Katouzzion

The Detroit Emeralds singles chronology
"Baby Let Me Take You (In My Arms)" (1972)	"Feel the Need in Me" (1972)	"You're Gettin' a Little Too Smart" (1973)

Official audio
- "Feel the Need in Me" on YouTube

"Feel the Need in Me" is a song written by Abrim Tilmon, a member of the American R&B/soul vocal group the Detroit Emeralds. It was released as a single by the group in October 1972 on the Westbound label. It reached number 4 on the UK Singles Chart, in March 1973 and number 22 on the R&B chart, and number 110 on the Billboard pop chart. The song was produced by Katouzzion and arranged by Abrim Tilmon and Johnny Allen.

The song was featured on their 1972 album You Want It, You Got It. It was featured on their 1973 album Feel the Need and has appeared on many other compilation albums since.

The group re-recorded the song and re-released a disco version in 1977 as "Feel the Need". This version reached number 12 on the UK Singles Chart, number 14 on the U.S. dance chart, number 73 on the R&B chart, and number 90 on the Billboard pop chart.

== Other ==
- Graham Central Station released a funk version of the song as a single called "Feel the Need" in 1975 which reached number 18 on the R&B chart and number 53 on the UK Singles chart.
- Leif Garrett released a version of the song as a single called "Feel the Need" in 1979, which reached number 38 on the UK Singles chart and number 57 on the Billboard pop chart.
- Forrest released a version of the song as a single in 1983, which reached number 17 on the UK Singles chart.
- Shakin' Stevens released a version of the song as a single in 1988, which reached number 26 on the UK Singles chart.
