= Do Me Right (song) =

Single by The Detroit Emeralds

from the album Do Me Right
- B-side: "Just Now and Then"
- Released: January 1971
- Genre: Soul
- Length: 2:47
- Label: Westbound 172
- Songwriter(s): Abrim Tilmon, James Mitchell
- Producer(s): Katouzzion

The Detroit Emeralds singles chronology
| "I Can't See Myself (Doing Without You)" (1970) | "Do Me Right" (1971) | "Wear This Ring (with Love)" (1971) |

"Do Me Right" is a song written by Abrim Tilmon and James Mitchell and performed by the Detroit Emeralds. The song was produced by Katouzzion and arranged by Abrim Tilmon and Sonny Sanders.

In the United States, it reached No. 7 on the R&B chart and No. 43 on the Billboard Hot 100 in 1971. The song was featured on their 1971 album, Do Me Right.

It is also the title of a different song released as a single by R&B singer Pebbles from her 1987 self-titled debut album. Her single reached #67 on the R&B charts.

== Chart performance ==
| Chart (1971) | Peak position |
|---|---|
| US Billboard Hot 100 | 43 |
| US Billboard Best Selling Soul Singles | 7 |

== Other versions ==
- Denise LaSalle released a version of the song as a single in 1973 in the United Kingdom, which did not chart.
