= GCS 2000 =

Studio album by Graham Central Station
- Released: July 21, 1998
- Genre: R&B; soul; funk
- Length: 50:36
- Label: NPG
- Producer: Larry Graham; Prince

Graham Central Station chronology
Star Walk (1979)	GCS 2000 (1998)

Professional ratings
Review scores
Source	Rating
AllMusic	3/5 stars

GCS 2000 is a studio album by funk group Graham Central Station released on July 21, 1998, on NPG Records. It was their first new album in America since 1979's Star Walk.

== Background ==
Prince had greatly boosted the career of another funk artist, Chaka Khan, in 1984 with her platinum-selling album, I Feel for You. In 1998, he tried to revitalize her career with the album Come 2 My House. It was released the same day as GCS 2000 and peaked at #49 R&B.

Prince's attempt to salvage Graham Central Station's status, however, was not as successful, and neither the album nor its singles charted in the U.S. One of the chief issues, as noted by Greg Prato at allmusic, was that "Too much Prince and not enough Graham makes GCS 2000 sound like a Prince solo album with Graham guesting, instead of a triumphant return to form from this trailblazing funk bass great." Another complaint was that the album, in contrast to prior Graham Central Station works, sounded much more like Prince's "studio perfection", whereas the group's prior works sounded "as if they were recorded entirely live".

A quick preview of the album reveals a departure from the slapping technique the band was known for. "Just B My Lady", "Don't Let 'Em Change You", "Groove On", "I Just Found Somebody to Love" and "Outro" (5 of the 12 tracks) all feature several characteristics reminiscent of P-funk's style.

== Track listing ==
All tracks were composed by Larry Graham alone, except for "Utopia", which Prince helped compose:

1. "Intro"
2. "GCS 2000"
3. "Free" (with Chaka Khan and Prince)
4. "U Move Me"
5. "Just B My Lady"
6. "Love 4 1another"
7. "Don't Let 'Em Change U"
8. "Utopia"
9. "Groove On"
10. " Just Found Somebody 2 Love"
11. "'magettin'" (instrumental)
12. "Outro"

== Personnel ==
- Larry Graham – bass, vocals, producer
- Cynthia Robinson – trumpet
- Jerry Martini – saxophone
- Gail Mudrow – guitar, vocals
- Wilson Rabb – guitar, vocals
- Robert "Butch" Sam – organ, vocals
- The NPG – additional shouts
- Brother Jules – scratches
- Prince – producer
- Hans-Martin Buff - recording and mixing engineer
- Tom Tucker - mixing engineer
