= Graham Central Station =

American band

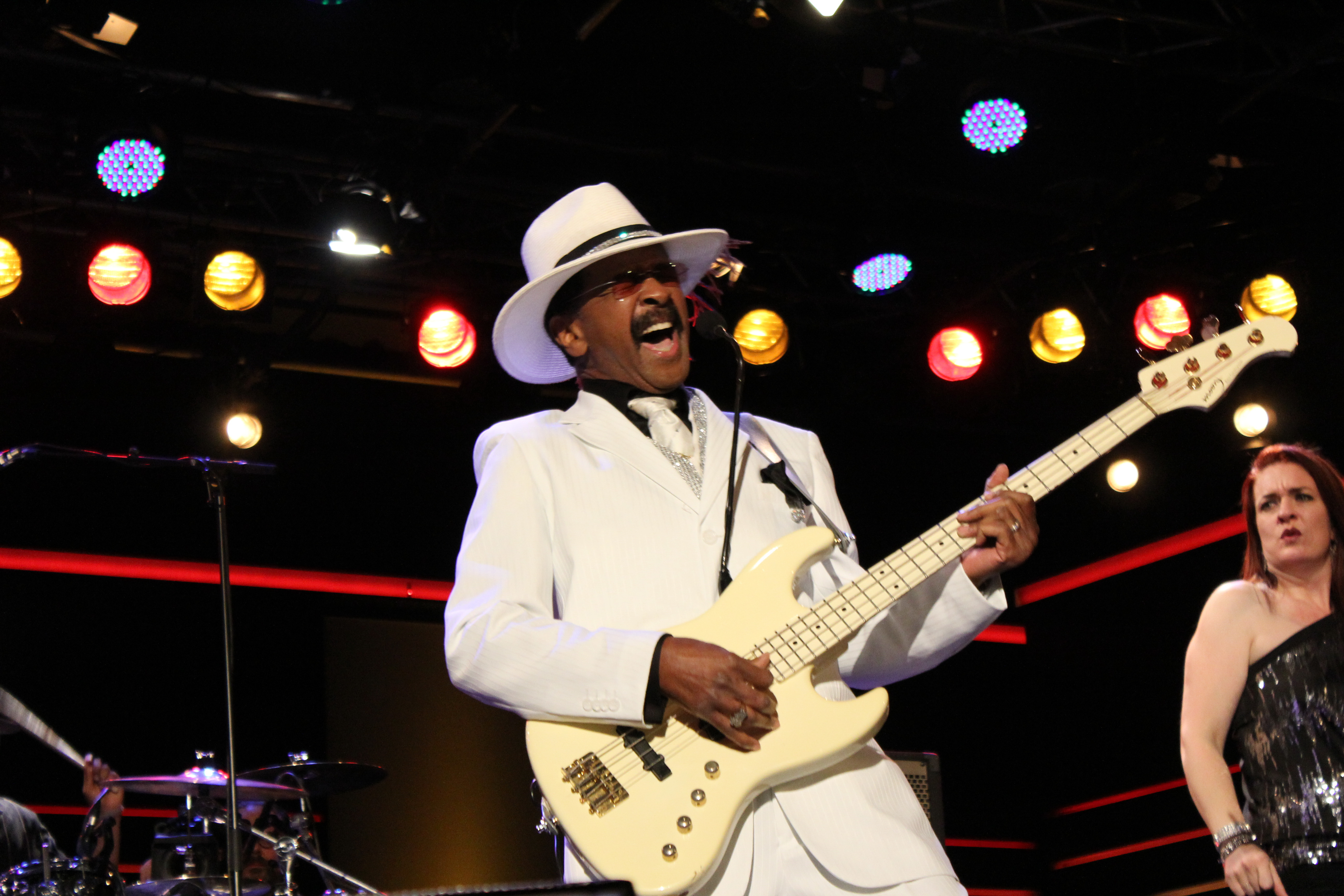
- Band founder Larry Graham in 2013

Background information
- Origin: Oakland, California, United States
- Genres: Funk; progressive soul
- Years active: 1973–1979, 1997–1998, 2012
- Labels: Warner Bros., WEA, Star Maker, P-Vine, Rhino
- Spinoff of: Hot Chocolate aka Hot Choc’let
- Past members: Larry Graham; David Vega; Hershall Kennedy; Willie Sparks; Patryce "Chocolate" Banks; Robert Sam

Graham Central Station was an American funk band named after founder Larry Graham (formerly of Sly and the Family Stone). The name is a pun on New York City's Grand Central Terminal, often colloquially called Grand Central Station.

== Background ==
=== Origins ===
While still with Sly and the Family Stone, Larry Graham came into contact with Patryce Banks. They formed an ensemble called Hot Choc’let aka Hot Chocolate. According to the I Rock Jazz website, Graham intended to build a band around Banks and his role would be that of composer and producer. The band was playing a gig at a San Francisco club and towards the end of the performance, the audience encouraged Graham to do the last song with the band. Things clicked there. This led to Graham replacing the bass guitarist with himself, and the name of the band was changed from Hot Chocolate to Graham Central Station. Due to his involvement with the group, he left Sly and the Family Stone.

The Graham Central Station line up was Graham, Willie Sparks, Patrice Banks, David Vega, Robert Sam and Hershell Kennedy. According to The Virgin Encyclopedia of Seventies Music, Vega, Kennedy, Sparks and Banks were from Hot Chocolate.

== Career ==
=== Highlights ===
In 1974, the band released the single "Can You Handle It?". It peaked at number 9 on the Billboard R&B charts and number 49 on the Billboard Hot 100. Graham Central Station's biggest hit was "Your Love", which charted at number 1 on the R&B charts in 1975. The same year, they issued a cover version of the Detroit Emeralds 1972 hit "Feel the Need in Me". It reached number 18 on the R&B charts and this would be the bands only hit on the UK singles chart, peaking at number 53. The group also integrated gospel music into their repertoire and played with the dichotomy between the funk/rock star image and the "sanctified" gospel group image. Some of their recordings feature the Tower of Power horn section.

In 2011, Graham Central Station opened for Prince on Prince's Welcome 2 America tour.

== Members ==
- Larry Graham – vocals, bass, guitar, clavinet, organ, piano, drums, percussion
- Lenny Williams – vocals
- Patryce Banks – vocals, electric funk box (Maestro Rhythm King), tambourine
- Ashling Cole – vocals, electric funk box (Maestro Rhythm King)
- Tina Graham – vocals, electric funk box (Maestro Rhythm King)
- David Vega – vocals, guitar
- Gail Muldrow – vocals, guitar, electric funk box
- George Johnson – vocals, guitar
- Wilton Rabb – guitar
- Freddie Stone – guitar
- Gemi Taylor – guitar
- Hershall Kennedy – vocals, clavinet, trumpet
- Robert "Butch" Sam – vocals, piano, organ
- David Council – vocals, keyboards
- Jimi McKinney Jr. – vocals, keyboards
- Rose Stone – vocals, organ, electric funk box
- Cynthia Robinson – trumpet
- P. CaboOse – tenor saxophone
- Jerry Martini – saxophone
- Dennis Marcellino – saxophone
- Willie Sparks – vocals, drums
- Manuel Kellough – drums
- Noel T. Closson – drums
- Gaylord Birch – drums
- Brian Braziel – drums
- Milt Holland – percussion

== Discography ==
=== Studio albums ===
Year	Album	Peak chart positions		Certifications	Label
Year	Album	US	US R&B	Certifications	Label
1974	Graham Central Station	48	20		Warner Bros.
1974	Release Yourself	51	22		Warner Bros.
1975	Ain't No 'Bout-A-Doubt It	22	4	US: Gold	Warner Bros.
1976	Mirror	46	7		Warner Bros.
1977	Now Do U Wanta Dance	67	12		Warner Bros.
1978	My Radio Sure Sounds Good to Me	105	18		WEA
1979	Star Walk	136	44		Warner Bros.
1997	By Popular Demand	—	—		P-Vine
1998	GCS 2000	—	—		NPG
2012	Raise Up	—	65		Moosicus Records
"—" denotes releases that did not chart.

=== Live albums ===
- Live in Japan '92' (1992) Star Maker – manufactured by PIA Corporation & Edoya Records Inc. (Tokyo, Japan)
- Live in London (1996) – Funk24 (London, England)
- Can You Handle This? (2003) – Kezar Stadium – 1975, Big Fro Discs (Japan)

=== Compilation albums ===
- The Best of Larry Graham and Graham Central Station, Vol. 1 (Warner Bros, 1996)
- The Jam: The Larry Graham & Graham Central Station Anthology, (Rhino, 2001)
- Greatest Hits (Rhino Flashback, 2003)

=== Singles ===
Year	Title	Chart positions			Album
Year	Title	US Pop	US R&B	UK	Album
1974	"We've Been Waiting"	―	―	―	Graham Central Station
1974	"It Ain't No Fun to Me"	―	―	―	Graham Central Station
1974	"Can You Handle It?"	49	9	―	Graham Central Station
1974	"Release Yourself"	―	56	—	Release Yourself
1975	"Feel the Need"	―	18	53	Release Yourself
1975	"Your Love"	38	1	―	Ain't No 'Bout-A-Doubt It
1975	"It's Alright"	92	19	―	Ain't No 'Bout-A-Doubt It
1976	"The Jam"	63	15	―	Ain't No 'Bout-A-Doubt It
1976	"Love (Covers a Multitude of Sin)"	—	14	―	Mirror
1976	"Entrow"	—	21	―	Mirror
1976	"I Got a Reason"	—	—	—	Mirror
1977	"Now Do-U-Wanta Dance"	—	10	―	Now Do U Wanta Dance
1977	"Stomped Beat-Up and Whooped"	―	25	―	Now Do U Wanta Dance
1977	"Saving My Love for You"	—	—	—	Now Do U Wanta Dance
1978	"My Radio Sure Sounds Good to Me"	―	18	―	My Radio Sure Sounds Good to Me
1978	"Is It Love?"	―	65	―	My Radio Sure Sounds Good to Me
1978	"Pow"	—	—	—	My Radio Sure Sounds Good to Me
1979	"(You're a) Foxy Lady"	—	37	—	Star Walk
1979	"Star Walk"	—	85	—	Star Walk
1979	"Sneaky Freak"	—	—	—	Star Walk
1998	"U Move Me"	—	—	—	GCS 2000
2012	"Raise Up"	—	—	—	Raise Up
"—" denotes releases that did not chart.
