= Waldo Holmes =

American musician and songwriter (1928–2021)

- Born: October 27, 1928; New York City, U.S.
- Died: September 1, 2021 (aged 92) Los Angeles, California
- Genres: R&B, soul, pop, jazz
- Occupations: Songwriter, producer, musician
- Instrument: Trumpet
- Years active: 1968–2021
- Label: RCA Records
- Formerly of: Brothers and Sisters; The Children of Howard Hughes; The Hues Corporation; The Yankee Wailers

Waldo T. "Wally" Holmes (October 27, 1928 – September 1, 2021) was an American musician and songwriter. He was the writer of the hit song "Rock the Boat" that was originally a hit for The Hues Corporation. His composition "I Got Caught Dancing Again" appears on the album Falling in Love by Rachelle Ann Go.

== Background ==
In 1968, Holmes was a trumpeter and songwriter residing in Los Angeles. A friend of his that he surfed with was St. Clair Lee who he would later work with in the music business. At that time Holmes was a school teacher.

== Music career ==
Holmes formed a soul pop group in 1968 called Brothers and Sisters that featured his friend Lee as lead singer. He planned to book them in Las Vegas clubs with an eight piece backing group. The group would break up due to a wrong combination of singers. On Lee's suggestion they formed another group. In 1969, a trio called Children of Howard Hughes was formed and they played the Circus Circus in Vegas. Later they became The Hues Corporation.

Holmes wrote their biggest hit "Rock the Boat" and then another song "I Caught Your Act".

It was reported in the February 1975 edition of Billboard magazine that he was signed to Famous Music and even though he was going to be involved in other assignments for Famous Music, he was going to retain his position as executive producer and writer for The Hues Corporation.

=== Compositions (selective) ===
- "Hold The High Ground", "Lookin' Around" appears on The Inrhodes - (single) - "Hold The High Ground" / "Lookin' Around" - Dunhill D-4055 (1966)

"Lookin' Around" co-written with Marjorie Brooks

- "Try And Stop Me" appears on The Inrhodes - (single) - "Try And Stop Me" / "Lookin' Around" - RCA Victor D-4078 (1967)
- "Boy Meets Girl" appears on Chico Holiday - (single) – "Now I Taste The Tears" / "Boy Meets Girl" - Shamley – S 44018 (1969)
- "Hello, Hello, Hello" appears on Misty Moore - (single) - "Hello, Hello, Hello" / "Wherefore And Why" - Pzazz 036 (1969)
- "Off My Cloud" appears on The Hues Corporation - (single)- "Freedom For The Stallion" / "Off My Cloud" - RCA Victor – 74-0900 (1973)
- "Rock the Boat" appears on The Hues Corporation - (single) - "Rock the Boat" / "All Goin' Down Together" - RCA Victor – APBO-0232 (1974)
- "I Caught Your Act", "Natural Find" appears on The Hues Corporation - (single) - "I Caught Your Act" / "Natural Find" - Warner Bros. / Curb WBS 8334 (1977)

== Later years ==
Holmes was the director of the Sweet and Hot Music Festival in 2008 and the 2011 event that was held at the Los Angeles Airport Marriott Hotel.

He was the leader of the traditional jazz group Yankee Wailers from Santa Monica that have played together in venues during 1988 and 2014. and singer-songwriter Ruby Fradkin. The Yankee Wailers play every year at the Sweet & Hot Music Festival.

One of the furthest reaches his song "Rock the Boat" has made has been on the Australian series, Playschool, in a program theme about water.

Holmes died in Los Angeles, California on September 1, 2021, at the age of 92.
