= The Detroit Emeralds =

American R&B/soul band

- Also known as: The Emeralds
- Origin: Little Rock, Arkansas, U.S.
- Genres: R&B, soul
- Years active: 1968–1978, 2019–present
- Labels: Ric-Tic, Westbound, MCM
- Members: James Mitchell Jr. Dewayne Loc Lomax; Alfonzo Livingston; Delbert Nelson
- Past members: Ivory Tilmon; Abrim Tilmon; Cleophus Tilmon; Raymond Tilmon; Marvin Willis; Michael Henderson; LaVel Jackson; Eddie Cameron

The Detroit Emeralds are an American R&B/soul vocal group, best known in the early 1970s. They enjoyed a run of successful records in the decade, including their 1973 transatlantic hit single, "Feel the Need in Me".

== Career ==
"The Emeralds" were formed as a vocal harmony group in Little Rock, Arkansas, and originally composed of four brothers, Ivory (September 14, 1941 – September 13, 2014), Abrim (January 12, 1945 – July 6, 1982), Cleophus and Raymond Tilmon. After Cleophus and Raymond left, the remaining Tilmon brothers were joined by childhood friend, James Mitchell. Moving to Detroit, Michigan, and expanding their name to the Detroit Emeralds, the trio had their first R&B chart success on Ric-Tic Records, with "Show Time" in 1968.

In 1970, they joined another Detroit-based label, Westbound Records. When touring in Memphis, Tennessee, they recorded some demo tracks at the Hi recording studios, run by top producer Willie Mitchell, to which they added vocals and strings back in Detroit. This approach worked and brought them another hit, "If I Lose Your Love", which was followed by a run of successes including "Do Me Right", "You Want It, You Got It", and "Baby Let Me Take You (In My Arms)" which all made the US R&B top 10, while the latter also reached number 24 on the US Billboard Hot 100 pop chart in 1972.

The song for which they are now best remembered, "Feel the Need in Me", reached number 22 US R&B in 1973, and a new longer version four years later also charted. The original track made the top five in the UK Singles Chart in 1973. The later production also made the UK chart in 1977 (number 12). "You Want It You Got It" was re-released in the UK as a follow-up to the initial "Feel the Need in Me", also reaching the UK top 20 in 1973. Abrim Tilmon wrote all of their hits, while also arranging and producing the tracks. The horns and strings were arranged by the Grammy award-winning arranger, Johnny Allen. The horns and strings were recorded in Detroit with Carl Austin as concertmaster and Johnny Trudell leading the horns.

By 1974, the group was falling apart and, at one point, two outfits were using the name. Abe Tilmon formed one new group using the Detroit Emeralds' name, while James Mitchell, along with Marvin Willis, wrote for another group, the Floaters – Paul Mitchell of the Floaters being James's brother. James Mitchell, Ivory Tilmon and Marvin Willis continued touring as the Detroit Emeralds and stayed active on the oldies and cabaret circuit for some years.

Abrim Tilmon died on July 6, 1982, at the age of 37, in his Southfield, Michigan, home of a heart attack. It was said a reunion of the group was being planned at the time. He was survived by his wife Janyce, son Steve, and daughter Cathy.

In 2019, the Detroit Emeralds was reformed by the group's founding member James Mitchell Jr. along with new members LaVel Jackson, Eddie Cameron and Dewayne Loc Lomax. They released a new single titled "Call Me, I'm Ready" in May 2019. In August 2021, they released the single "Victory". In November 2021, they released another single titled "Face 2 Face". In October 2022, they released another single titled "In My Life".

== Discography ==
=== Studio albums ===
Year	Album	Peak chart positions		Record label
Year	Album	US	US R&B	Record label
1971	Do Me Right	151	23	Westbound
1972	You Want It, You Got It	78	37	Westbound
1973	I'm in Love with You	181	27	Westbound
1977	Feel the Need	—	—	Westbound
1978	Let's Get Together	—	—	Westbound
"—" denotes a recording that did not chart.

=== Compilation albums ===
- Abe, James and Ivory (1973, Westbound)
- Greatest Hits (1998, Westbound)

=== Singles ===
Year	Single	Peak chart positions					Album
Year	Single	US	US R&B	US Dan	CAN	UK	Album
1968	"Show Time"	89	22	—	—	—	Non-album singles
1968	"Shades Down"	—	—	—	—	—	Non-album singles
1968	"(I'm an Ordinary Man) Take Me the Way I Am"	—	—	—	—	—	Non-album singles
1969	"Holding On"	—	—	—	—	—	Do Me Right
1970	"If I Lose Your Love"	—	32	—	—	—	Do Me Right
1970	"I Can't See Myself Doing Without You" / "Just Now and Then"	—	41	—	—	—	Do Me Right
1971	"Do Me Right" / "Just Now and Then"	43	7	—	95	—	Do Me Right
1971	"Wear This Ring (with Love)" / "I Bet You Get the One (Who Loves You)"	91	18	—	—	—	Do Me Right
1971	"You Want It, You Got It" / "Till You Decide to Come Home"	36	5	—	—	12	You Want It, You Got It
1972	"Baby Let Me Take You (In My Arms)" / "I'll Never Sail The Sea Again"	24	4	—	—	—	You Want It, You Got It
1972	"Feel the Need in Me" / "There's a Love for Me Somewhere"	110	22	—	—	4	You Want It, You Got It
1973	"You're Gettin' a Little Too Smart"	101	10	—	—	—	I'm in Love with You
1973	"I Think of You"	—	—	—	—	27	I'm in Love with You
1973	"Lee" / "Whatcha Gonna Wear Tomorrow"	—	79	—	—	—	Abe, James and Ivory
1977	"Feel the Need" (re-recording)	90	73	14	—	12	Feel the Need
1977	"Set It Out" / "I'm Qualified"	—	—	—	—	—	Feel the Need
1978	"Turn on Lady" / "I Just Don't Know About This Girl of Mine"	—	—	11	—	—	Let's Get Together
1978	"Let's Get Together" / "Have a Good Day"	—	—	11	—	—	Let's Get Together
2019	"Call Me, I'm Ready"	—	—	—	—	—	—N/a
2021	"Victory"	—	—	—	—	—	—N/a
2021	"Face 2 Face"	—	—	—	—	—	—N/a
2022	"In My Life"	—	—	—	—	—	—N/a
"—" denotes a recording that did not chart or was not released in that territory.

== See also ==
- List of soul musicians
- List of disco artists (S–Z)
- List of Soul Train episodes
- Music of Michigan
