= Rock the Boat (The Hues Corporation song) =

1974 single by The Hues Corporation

Single by The Hues Corporation

from the album Freedom for the Stallion
- B-side: "All Goin' Down Together"
- Released: May 1974
- Recorded: 1973
- Genre: Disco; soul; R&B
- Length: 3:22 (album version); 3:06 (single version)
- Label: RCA Records
- Songwriter: Wally Holmes
- Producer: John Florez

The Hues Corporation singles chronology
"Freedom for the Stallion" (1973)	"Rock the Boat" (1974)	"Rockin' Soul" (1974)

Performance video" Rock the Boat" (on TopPop) on YouTube

"Rock the Boat" is a song by American trio The Hues Corporation, written by Wally Holmes. "Rock the Boat" was first featured on their 1973 debut studio album Freedom for the Stallion (the single edit later appeared on certain editions of the band's 1974 second album Rockin' Soul). It was released as the third single from the album in early 1974, to follow up Stallion's title song, which had peaked at number sixty-three on the Hot 100, and "Miracle Maker (Sweet Soul Shaker)" which did not chart.

Initially, "Rock the Boat" appeared as though it would also flop, as months went by without any radio airplay or sales activity. Not until the song became a disco favorite in New York did Top 40 radio finally pick up on the song, leading the record to finally enter the Hot 100 and zip up the chart to number one the week of July 6, 1974, in only its seventh week on the chart (and fourth week in the Top 40). The record also reached the top ten in the United Kingdom. "Rock the Boat" is considered one of the earliest disco songs. Some authorities proclaim it to be the first disco song to hit number one on the Billboard Hot 100 chart, while others give that distinction to "Love's Theme" by Love Unlimited Orchestra or "TSOP (The Sound of Philadelphia)" by MFSB, both chart-toppers from earlier in 1974. The song became a gold record. It is a heavy airplay favorite on oldie and adult contemporary stations today.

== Composition and recording ==
Holmes wrote the song for the band's first album, and started the song with the line "Ever since our voyage of love began..". In an attempt to make it more punchy, producer John Florez suggested starting with the line "So I'd like to know where you got the notion."

The song features a lead vocal by Fleming Williams, who left The Hues Corporation shortly after the song was recorded. According to The Billboard Book of Number One Hits by Fred Bronson, the lone female member of the group, H. Ann Kelley, had originally been pegged to sing lead, but this idea was discarded out of fear that groups with female lead singers were less commercially viable. The bass player on the session was Wilton Felder, not James Jamerson as sometimes reported. Florez also brought in two other members of the Jazz Crusaders, Joe Sample on piano and Larry Carlton on guitar, as well as Jim Gordon on drums. Wally Holmes wrote and played the trumpet line.

Producer John Florez did not like the lyrics for "Rock the Boat", calling them "trite", and it was originally made a B-side. After a riveting response from New York City's dance clubs, Florez remixed the song to boost the bass and rhythm instruments, and it was quickly re-released, becoming a smash.

The Hues Corporation member St. Clair Lee claims "It was a song that you could do anything on. You could cuddle or you could get crazy if you wanted to. It was a love song without being a love song. But, it was a Disco hit and it happened because of the discos."

The song features a change in meter in the pre-chorus during the words "love and devotion" where it is 3/4 for one measure while the rest of the song is in common time.

== Legacy ==
A dance to "Rock the Boat" is commonly performed at weddings and birthday parties, involving many people sitting down in a row and "rowing" a boat to the tune of the song. Particularly popular in Ireland continuing into the UK in the 1970s, the dance regained international attention after being featured on the second season of the TV series Derry Girls. A similar dance is done in parts of the United Kingdom to "Oops Up Side Your Head".

== Chart performance ==
In addition to hitting number one on the Billboard charts for one week in July 1974, "Rock The Boat" spent three weeks at number one on popular New York Top 40 radio station WABC. It was so popular in New York that WABC named "Rock The Boat" the number one song on the station's "Top 100 of 1974."

== Charts ==
=== Weekly charts ===
Chart (1974)	Peak position
Argentina	2
Australia (Kent Music Report)	18
Canada Top Singles (RPM)	1
Canada Adult Contemporary (RPM)	1
Ireland (IRMA)	9
Netherlands (Single Top 100)	4
New Zealand (Listener)	8
South Africa (Springbok)	5
UK Singles (Official Charts)	6
US Billboard Hot 100	1
US Adult Contemporary (Billboard)	12
US Dance Club Songs (Billboard)	5
US Hot R&B/Hip-Hop Songs (Billboard)	2
US Cash Box Top 100	1

=== Year-end charts ===
Chart (1974)	Rank
Canada Top Singles (RPM)	9
Netherlands (Single Top 100)	22
US Billboard Hot 100	43
US Cash Box Top 100	27

== Certifications ==
Certifications for "Rock the Boat"
Region	Certification	Certified units/sales
United Kingdom (BPI)	Silver	250,000^{^}
United States (RIAA)	Gold	1,000,000^{^}
^{^} Shipments figures based on certification alone.

== Forrest version ==
"Rock the Boat"

Single by Forrest

from the album One Lover
- Released: January 1, 1983
- Recorded: 1982
- Genre: Post-disco
- Length: 4:33
- Label: Ariola
- Songwriter: Wally Holmes
- Producers: Ben Liebrand, John Tilly

Forrest singles chronology
"Rock the Boat" (1983)	"Dancing with My Shadow" (1983)

"Rock the Boat" was covered in 1982 by American-Dutch singer Forrest. It was a hit in the Netherlands, where it peaked at No. 7 on the Single Top 100. In the US, the song reached the top 10 of the Billboard Dance/Disco chart, at No. 9. It also peaked at number 33 in Australia. It was most successful in the UK, reaching No. 4 on the UK Singles Chart in March 1983. The music video featured Sinitta before she was famous.

A re-recording of the song was released in 1989, titled "Rock the Boat '89", produced by Marc Hartman and Sven van Veen, with remixes by Martin Boer.

== Other versions ==
In 1990, British girl group Delage recorded their version, produced by the British production trio Stock Aitken Waterman. The single peaked at No. 63 on the UK Singles Chart.

== In other media ==
In the Family Guy episode "A Very Special Family Guy Freakin' Christmas" Cleveland, Joe and Quagmire sing the song.

In The Simpsons episode "The Wettest Stories Ever Told", the song is played in a scene of a parody of the 1972 film The Poseidon Adventure.

The song was used in the main commercial for the 2021 American film Jungle Cruise.
