= Do Me Right (album) =

Studio album by The Detroit Emeralds
- Released: 1971
- Genre: Soul, R&B
- Length: 37:53
- Label: Westbound
- Producer: Katouzzion

The Detroit Emeralds chronology
Do Me Right (1971)	You Want It, You Got It (1972)

Singles from Do Me Right
- 1. "If I Lose Your Love"/"I Bet You Get the One (Who Loves You)" Released: December 1969; 2. "I Can't See Myself (Doing Without You)"/"Just Now and Then" Released: May 1970; 3. "Do Me Right"/"Just Now and Then" Released: January 1971; 4. "Wear This Ring (with Love)"/"I Bet You Get the One (Who Loves You)" Released: June 1971

Professional ratings
Review scores
Source	Rating
AllMusic	2.5/5 stars
Christgau's Record Guide	B

Do Me Right is the debut studio album by American vocal group, The Detroit Emeralds, released in 1971 through Westbound Records.

== Commercial performance ==
The album peaked at No. 23 on the R&B albums chart. It also reached No. 151 on the Billboard 200. The album features the title track, which peaked at No. 7 on the Hot Soul Singles chart and No. 43 on the Billboard Hot 100, and "Wear This Ring (with Love)", which charted at No. 18 on the Hot Soul Singles chart and No. 91 on the Billboard Hot 100.

== Track listing ==
Side one
No.	Title	Writer(s)	Length
1.	"Do Me Right"	Abrim Tilmon, James Mitchell	2:47
2.	"Wear This Ring (with Love)"	Abrim Tilmon, James Mitchell	3:13
3.	"Long Live the King"	Abrim Tilmon, Sam Beatty, Tom Grazcyk	3:30
4.	"What You Gonna Do About Me"	William Garrett	3:17
5.	"You Can't Take This Love for You, from Me"	Abrim Tilmon, Sam Beatty, Tom Grazcyk	3:12
6.	"Just Now and Then"	Abrim Tilmon	3:21

Side two
No.	Title	Writer(s)	Length
7.	"Lee"	Abrim Tilmon, Sam Beatty, Tom Grazcyk	2:48
8.	"If I Lose Your Love"	Abrim Tilmon, James Mitchell	3:16
9.	"And I Love Her"	John Lennon, McCartney	3:15
10.	"I Can't See Myself (Doing Without You)"	William Garrett	3:18
11.	"Holding On"	Norma Toney, Hermon Weems	2:42
12.	"Admit Your Love Is Gone"	Abrim Tilmon, Sam Beatty, Tom Grazcyk	3:11

== Personnel ==
- Katouzzion – producer
- Abrim Tilmon – arranger, conductor
- Willie Mitchell – arranger, conductor

== Charts ==
Album

Chart (1971)	Peaks
U.S. Billboard Top LPs	151
U.S. Billboard Top Soul LPs	23

Singles

Year	Single	Peaks		
Year	Single	US	US R&B	CAN
1970	"If I Lose Your Love"	—	32	
1970	"I Can't See Myself Doing Without You"	—	41	
1970	"Just Now and Then"	—	41	
1971	"Do Me Right"	43	7	95
1971	"Wear This Ring (with Love)"	91	18	
