= Happy Now (Thick album) =

Studio album by Thick
- Released: August 19, 2022
- Studio: Studio G, Brooklyn, New York, New York City, US
- Genre: Pop punk
- Length: 33:13
- Language: English
- Label: Epitaph
- Producer: Joel Hamilton

Thick chronology
5 Years Behind (2020)	Happy Now (2022)

"A lot of our songs on the last two albums are very mixed, and they interweave between getting angry but being OK, and resilient. We're trying to lean into having this one tone and one voice for future writing. Let's [put] this feeling of depletion front-row center."

—Guitarist and vocalist Nikki Sisti on the emotional themes on Thick's first two full-length albums.

Happy Now is a 2022 studio album by American pop punk band Thick.

== Reception ==
Shawn Donohue of Glide Magazine wrote that "personal, raw, emotions are front and center" on this album, with the band "using both heavy and light to question societal issues and personal relationship pains in an affecting manner". Kerrang!'s Luke Morton rated this album a 3 out of 5, summing up that the band "aren't necessarily making something you haven't heard before, but if you're after a record to crank up with a few tinnies in the park while wishing the wasters in your life would fuck off, this is the one for you". At Louder Than War, Iain Key stating that listeners can hear "an evolution with this album, which encompasses bringing sharper arrangements, stickier hooks and more explosive energy, something that happens and is best achieved when the trio singing in unstoppable unison" compared to 2020's 5 Years Behind. Writing for MTV, Mia Hughes noted that the band "don't deal in two-dimensional punk" and explore complex emotions in their lyrics: they "don't shy away from anger or any other emotion, either; the themes on Happy Now range from rage, to self-loathing, to thankfulness, to fear, to hope".

== Track listing ==
1. "Happiness" – 2:19
2. "I Wish 2016 Never Happened" – 3:44
3. "Loser" – 3:13
4. "Tell Myself" – 2:29
5. "Her Chapstick" – 3:13
6. "Your Garden" – 2:33
7. "Montreal" – 2:59
8. "Wants & Needs" – 3:54
9. "Maybe Tomorrow" – 2:50
10. "Disappear" – 3:18
11. "Something Went Wrong" – 2:41

== Personnel ==
Thick

- Kate Black – bass guitar, synthesizer, vocals, art direction, design
- Shari Page – drums, vocals, art direction, design
- Nikki Sisti – guitar, vocals, art direction, design

Additional personnel

- Banana Bones – logo
- Kait DeAngelis – photography
- Joel Hamilton – percussion, engineering, mixing, production
- Jason Link – art direction, design
- Kaleen Reading – drums on "Doomer"
- Justin Termotto – engineering
- Mike Tucci – mastering

== See also ==
- 2022 in American music
- Lists of 2022 albums
