= Graham Central Station (album) =

Studio album by Graham Central Station
- Released: January 1974
- Recorded: 1973–1974
- Studios: Wally Heider (San Francisco); Record Plant (Sausalito); Warner Bros. Studios (North Hollywood)
- Genre: Funk
- Length: 38:23
- Label: Warner Bros. Records
- Producers: Larry Graham; Russ Titelman

Graham Central Station chronology
Graham Central Station (1974)	Release Yourself (1974)

Singles from Graham Central Station
- 1. "We've Been Waiting" / "It Ain't No Fun to Me" b/w "Can You Handle It?" Released: 1974; 2. "Can You Handle It?" b/w "Ghetto" Released: 1974

Graham Central Station is the debut album by former Sly and the Family Stone bass player Larry Graham's new band Graham Central Station.

== Background ==
In late 1972, Larry Graham quit Sly and the Family Stone because of tensions with group leader Sly Stone. After agreeing to produce a band named Hot Chocolate (not to be confused with British pop band Hot Chocolate), he decided to join the band and renamed them Graham Central Station in 1973.

The album was also released on vinyl in the CD-4 quadraphonic format on Warner Bros. BS4 2763, and quadraphonic 8-track cartridge on Warner Bros. WB L9B 2763 in 1974.

== Album cover ==
The cover photo was taken at the Third and Townsend Southern Pacific Depot in San Francisco. The station was demolished shortly afterward from 1975 to 1976.

== Reception ==
Professional ratings
Review scores
Source	Rating
Allmusic	3/5 stars

Released in 1974, the album peaked at number twenty on the Billboard Top Soul Albums charts while the single, "Can You Handle It?" peaked at #9 on the Billboard Soul Singles chart.

In his review for Allmusic, Donald A. Guarisco called the track "Hair" "pure magic," adding that it "wraps a clever lyric about tolerance around a huge groove driven by one of Graham's serpentine basslines." He also called out "Can You Handle It?" as another highlight and credited "Ain’t No Fun to Me" and "We Be's Gettin' Down" with making the album "equal parts pop-soul and funk" respectively, but determined overall the lyrics on some songs to be rather underdeveloped and that "casual listeners" may want to pick up the album's best songs on a compilation.

== "Hair" ==
While not released as a single, the track "Hair" went on to become one of Graham's most popular compositions among fans. Graham has said that like many of his songs, it was built around the bassline, which opens the track.

In a 1995 interview, Graham said of the song's origins;

"Hair. I got into that song because people used to really ask me everywhere; 'Is that really all your hair?' Because I had this hair that was like...BOOM. I mean it was like...you know, hanging down, big 'fro—super 'fro. And people would literally ask me, so that's why I wrote the song.

== Covers and samples ==
"It Ain't No Fun to Me", which is a cover of the song by Al Green, was sampled by Da Lench Mob.

"People" was sampled by Das EFX and KAM, while the line "People, people, people" was used on Santana's Supernatural as part of "The Calling."

== Track listing ==
All songs written by Larry Graham except where indicated. Timings taken from original Warner Bros LP.

Side One
No.	Title	Writer(s)	Length
1.	"We've Been Waiting"		0:57
2.	"It Ain't No Fun To Me"	Al Green	5:11
3.	"Hair"		4:55
4.	"We Be's Gettin' Down"		4:43
5.	"Tell Me What It Is"		4:56

Side Two
No.	Title	Writer(s)	Length
6.	"Can You Handle It?"		5:10
7.	"People"	Graham, Freddie Stone	4:31
8.	"Why?"		3:37
9.	"Ghetto"		4:23

- The original cassette version places "Why" at the end of side A and "Hair" at the start of side B.

== Personnel ==
=== Musicians ===
Graham Central Station

- Larry Graham – bass (except track 1), fuzz bass (tracks 3 and 7), guitar (tracks 3, 4, and 6), piano (tracks 5, 8, and 9), clavinet (tracks 4, 8, and 9), organ (track 4), drums (tracks 5, 8, and 9), percussion (track 5), lead vocals (tracks 2, 3, and 6), vocals (tracks 1, 5, 7, and 9), and background vocals (track 4), horn arrangements
- Patryce "Chocolate" Banks – electric funk box (tracks 2, 3, and 6–8), background vocals (tracks 2—4 and 6–8), lead vocals (tracks 4 and 8), vocals (track 1, 5, and 9)
- Hershall "Happiness" Kennedy – clavinet and trumpet (tracks 2, 3, 6, and 7), organ (track 8), background vocals (tracks 2, 3, 7), vocals (track 1)
- Robert "Butch" Sam – piano (track 2), organ (tracks 2, 3, 6, 7, and 9), background vocals (tracks 2, 3, 6, 7), vocals (track 1)
- Willie "Wild" Sparks – drums (tracks 2–4, 6, and 7), vocals (track 1)
- David "Dynamite" Vega – guitar (tracks 2, 3, 6–8), vocals (track 1)

with:

- Freddie Stone – guitar (track 5)
- Pascal Caboose - tenor saxophone (tracks 2, 3, 6, and 7)
- Milt Holland – percussion (track 4)
- Lenny Williams – vocals (tracks 5 and 9)
- Clarence McDonald – string arrangements
- uncredited – finger snapping and hand clapping on "We've Been Waiting"

=== Technical ===
- Steve Barncard – engineer
- Donn Landee – engineer
- Mallory Earl – engineer
- Tom Flye – engineer, mixed by
- Lee Herschberg – mixed by
- Tom Anderson – assistant engineer
- Steve Jarvis – assistant engineer
- Trudy Portch – production coordination
- Herb Greene – photography
- Mike Salisbury – cover design

== Charts ==
Chart (1974)	Peak position
Billboard Pop Albums	48
Billboard Top Soul Albums	20

=== Singles ===
Year	Single	Chart positions	
Year	Single	US Pop	US Soul
1974	"Can You Handle It?"	49	9

== Later years ==
In 2024, the album which had a quadraphonic released in 1974, was released in Quadio Blu-Ray Audio format.
