= Larry Graham =

American bassist and singer (born 1946)

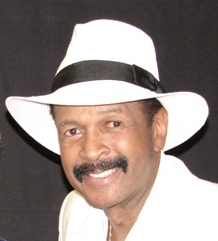
- Graham in 2011

Background information
- Born: Larry Graham Jr. August 14, 1946 (age 79); Beaumont, Texas, U.S.
- Genres: Funk; soul; R&B
- Occupation: Musician; songwriter; producer
- Instruments: Vocals; bass guitar
- Years active: 1961–present
- Labels: Epic; Warner Bros.; NPG; Rhino
- Formerly of: Sly and the Family Stone; Graham Central Station; Prince
- Website: larrygraham.com

Larry Graham Jr. (born August 14, 1946) is an American bassist and baritone singer, with the psychedelic soul/funk band Sly and the Family Stone and as the founder and frontman of Graham Central Station. In 1980, he released the single "One in a Million You", which reached the top ten on the US Billboard Hot 100. He is credited with the invention of the slapping technique on the electric bass guitar, which radically expanded the tonal palette of the bass, although he himself refers to the technique as "thumpin' and pluckin'".

In 1993, he was inducted into the Rock and Roll Hall of Fame as a member of Sly and the Family Stone. He is also the uncle of rapper Drake.

== Early life ==
Graham was born August 14, 1946, in Beaumont, Texas, U.S., to parents who were successful musicians.

== Career ==
=== Sly and the Family Stone ===
Graham played bass in the funk band Sly and the Family Stone from 1967 to 1972. The band was the first major American rock group to have a racially integrated, mixed-gender lineup. They had a series of influential tracks during the 1960s that entered the Billboard Hot 100 such as "Dance to the Music" (1968), "Everyday People" (1968), and "Thank You (Falettinme Be Mice Elf Agin)" (1969), as well as critically acclaimed albums such as Stand! (1969), which combined pop sensibility with social commentary.

After many years of tension between Graham and frontman Sly Stone, Larry Graham left Sly and the Family Stone in 1972, after a post-concert brawl broke out between Graham and Sly, and rumors also spread that Larry had hired a hit man to kill Sly. Graham and his wife climbed out of a hotel window to escape, and Pat Rizzo gave them a ride to safety. Unable to continue working with Sly, Graham immediately quit. In 1993, he was inducted into the Rock and Roll Hall of Fame as a member of Sly and the Family Stone.

=== 1970s ===
After Sly and the Family Stone, Graham formed his own band, Graham Central Station. The name is a pun on Grand Central Station, the train station located in Manhattan, New York City. Graham Central Station had R&B hit "Can You Handle It" in 1974.

In the mid-1970s, Larry Graham worked with Betty Davis, the second ex-wife of jazz musician Miles Davis. Betty Davis' band included members of the Tower of Power horns and the Pointer Sisters, and she recorded three albums to critical acclaim but limited commercial success.

In 1975, Graham became one of Jehovah's Witnesses. Eventually, he was credited with introducing Prince to the faith. In the early 1980s, Graham recorded five solo albums and had several solo hits on the R&B chart. His biggest hit was "One in a Million You", a crossover hit that reached No. 9 on the Billboard Hot 100 chart in 1980.

=== 1990s–present ===
He reformed Graham Central Station in the early 1990s and performed with the band for several years during which they released two live albums. One was recorded in Japan in 1992, and the other, recorded in London in 1996, had only 1000 copies printed and was exclusively sold at concerts.

In 1998, he recorded a solo album under the name Graham Central Station GCS 2000. It was a collaboration between Larry Graham and Prince. While Graham wrote all the songs, except one co-written by Prince, the album was co-arranged and co-produced by Prince, and most of the instruments and vocals were recorded by both Graham and Prince. Graham also played bass on tours with Prince from 1997 to 2000. He appeared in Prince's 1998 VHS Beautiful Strange and 1999 DVD Rave Un2 the Year 2000. He has since appeared with Prince at various international venues. Graham and Graham Central Station performed internationally with a world tour in 2010 and the "Funk Around the World" international tour in 2011.

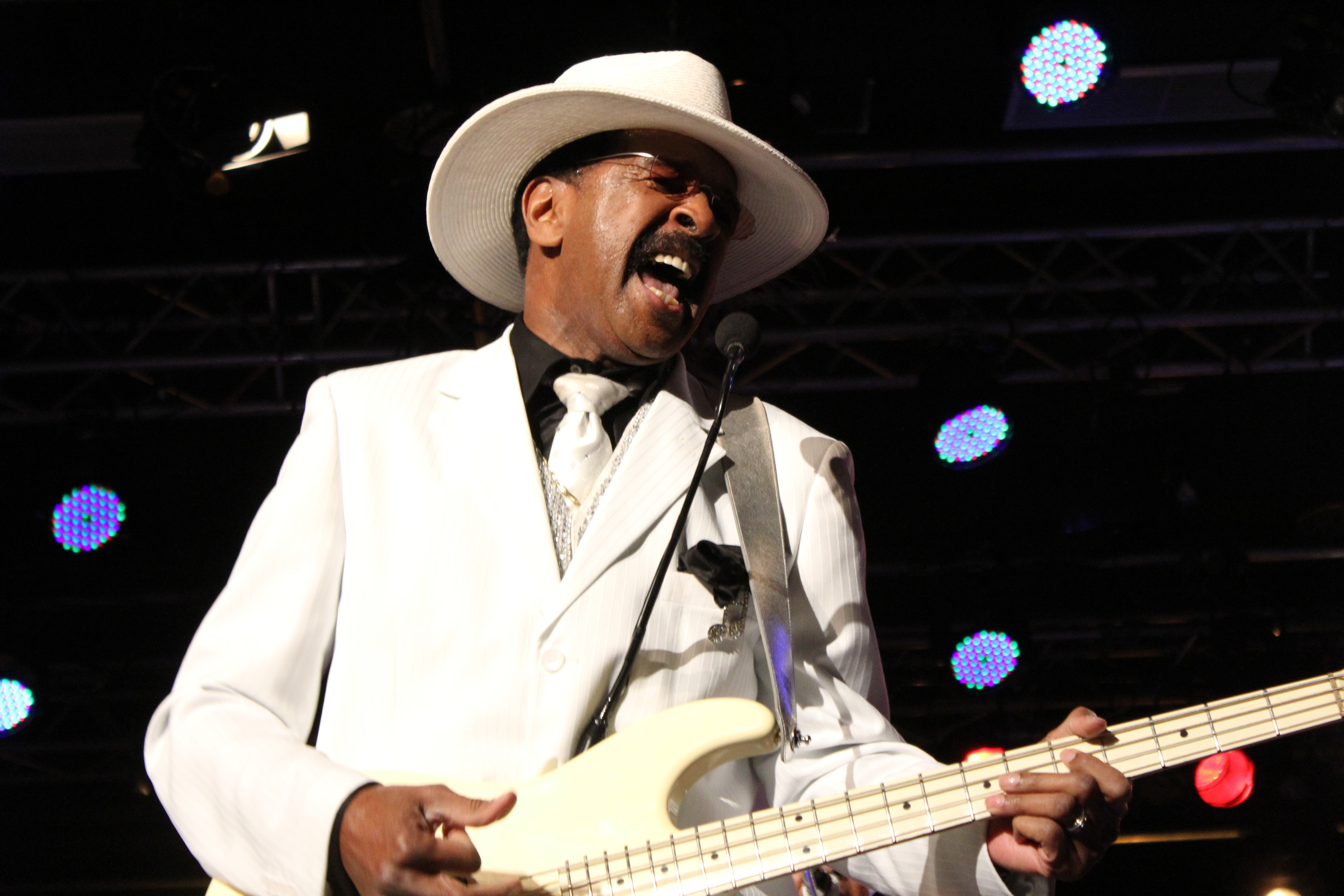
Graham performing in 2013

He appeared as a special guest with Zigaboo Modeliste, R.Kelly, Billy Idle at My Morning Jacket member Jim James' "Rock N' Soul Dance Party Superjam" at the 2013 Bonnaroo Music Festival.

In 2020, he was ranked number 7 on Rolling Stone's list of "50 Greatest Bassists of All Time."

== Personal life ==
Graham is the half-brother of Dennis Graham, and the uncle of Canadian rapper and actor Drake.

== Slap bass technique ==
Graham pioneered the slapping and popping technique on the electric bass (though he refers to it as "thumpin' and pluckin'"), in part to provide percussive and rhythmic elements to the bass line when his mother decided to no longer have a drummer in her band. This style couples a percussive thumb-slapping of the lower strings with an aggressive finger-snap of the higher strings, the slap of the thumb used to emulate a bass drum and the pop of the index or middle finger a snare drum. The slap-and-pop technique also uses a lot of muted or "dead" notes, which adds to the rhythmic effect. Radically expanding the tonal palette of the bass, the style has become the archetype of modern funk.

The slapping style was later used by such artists as Bootsy Collins (Parliament-Funkadelic), Prince, Les Claypool (Primus), Bernard Edwards (Chic), Louis Johnson, Mark King, Keni Burke, Victor Wooten, Kim Clarke of Defunkt, Flea (Red Hot Chili Peppers), Fieldy (Korn), Marcus Miller, and Stanley Clarke.

== Discography ==
=== Solo albums ===
Year	Album	Peak chart positions	
Year	Album	US	US R&B
1980	One in a Million You	26	2
1981	Just Be My Lady	46	8
1982	Sooner or Later	142	15
1983	Victory	173	52
1985	Fired Up	—	—
2019	Chillin'	—	—
"—" denotes releases that did not chart.

=== Singles ===
Year	Single	Album	Peak chart positions				
Year	Single	Album	US	US R&B	US Dance	US A/C	UK
1980	"One in a Million You"	One in a Million You	9	1	—	37	—
1980	"When We Get Married"	One in a Million You	76	9	—	—	—
1981	"Guess Who"	Just Be My Lady	—	69	—	—	—
1981	"Just Be My Lady"	Just Be My Lady	67	4	—	—	—
1982	"Don't Stop When You're Hot"/ "Sooner or Later"	Sooner or Later	102; 110	16; 27	17	—	54
1983	"I Never Forget Your Eyes"	Victory	—	34	—	—	—
"—" denotes releases that did not chart or were not released in that territory.

=== With Sly and the Family Stone ===
- A Whole New Thing (1967)
- Dance to the Music (1968)
- Life (1968)
- Stand! (1969)
- There's a Riot Goin' On (1971)

=== With Graham Central Station ===
==== Albums ====
Studio

- Graham Central Station (Warner Bros., 1974)
- Release Yourself (Warner Bros., 1974)
- Ain't No 'Bout-A-Doubt It (Warner Bros., 1975)
- Mirror (Warner Bros., 1976)
- Now Do U Wanta Dance (Warner Bros., 1977)
- My Radio Sure Sounds Good to Me (Warner Bros., 1978)
- Star Walk (Warner Bros., 1979)
- Back by Popular Demand (1997)
- GCS 2000 (1998)
- Raise Up (2012)

Live

- Live in Japan (1992)
- Live in London (1996)

Compilation

- The Best of Larry Graham and Graham Central Station, Vol. 1 (Warner Bros., 1996)

==== Singles ====
Year	Single	Album	Peak chart positions
Year	Single	Album	US
1974	"Can You Handle It?"	Graham Central Station	49
1975	"Your Love"	Ain't No 'Bout-A-Doubt It	38
1975	"It's Alright"	Ain't No 'Bout-A-Doubt It	92
1976	"The Jam"	Ain't No 'Bout-A-Doubt It	63

==== With Prince ====
- Rave Un2 the Joy Fantastic (1999)
- Rave In2 the Joy Fantastic (2001)
- The Rainbow Children (2001)

=== With Gov't Mule ===
- The Deep End, Volume 1
