= Johnny Allen (arranger) =

American musician

- Born: September 20, 1917; Uchee, Alabama, U.S.
- Died: January 29, 2014 (aged 96) Detroit, Michigan, U.S.
- Genres: Jazz, R&B
- Instrument: Piano

Johnny Allen (September 20, 1917 – January 29, 2014) was an American jazz and R&B musician who worked for both Motown and Stax Records and received a Grammy Award with Isaac Hayes for his arrangement of "Theme from Shaft".

== Early life ==
He was born in Uchee, Alabama, and grew up in Chicago before moving to Detroit in 1936. A self-taught pianist, his main influence was Earl Hines.

== Career ==
Starting in the early 1940s, he worked as musical director at the Club Congo, a nightclub in the basement of the Norwood Hotel, where he led a 12-piece band that played at dances and accompanied visiting acts such as Billie Holiday and the Mills Brothers.

He first worked for Motown in 1959, and wrote arrangements for the Temptations, Stevie Wonder, and the Supremes among others. He later worked for the Stax label, working with leading musicians such as the Staple Singers, the Dramatics and Isaac Hayes. After arranging strings and horns on Hayes' album Hot Buttered Soul, the pair worked together on Shaft, and at the 14th Annual Grammy Awards in 1972 jointly won the award for Best Instrumental Arrangement for "Theme From Shaft". Allen also worked consistently with Detroit producer Don Davis at his United Sound Studios, providing arrangements for acts such as Johnnie Taylor and The Dells.

Allen continued to perform with small jazz groups in Detroit until he was in his nineties.

== Personal life ==
Allen died at Henry Ford Hospital of complications from pneumonia, at the age of 96.
