= Middle of the Road discography =

Band discography

- Studio albums: 11
- Compilation albums: 9
- Singles: 28

This is the discography of Scottish pop band Middle of the Road.

== Albums ==
=== Studio albums ===
Year	Title	Details	Peak chart positions					
Year	Title	Details	DEN	FIN	GER	IT	NL	NOR
1971	Middle of the Road	Released: March 1971; Label: RCA; Italy-only release; Later released internationally with a different track listing as Chirpy Chirpy Cheep Cheep	7	—	—	—	—	3
1972	Acceleration	Released: January 1972; Label: RCA	6	15	13	24	2	2
1973	Drive On	Released: April 1973; Label: RCA	8	—	48	—	—	—
1973	Music Music	Released: October 1973; Label: Ariola	10	—	45	—	—	—
1974	You Pays Yer Money And You Takes Yer Chance	Released: 1974; Label: Ariola	—	—	—	—	—	—
1974	Postcard	Released: 1974; Label: Ariola	—	—	—	—	—	—
1975	Dice	Released: 1975; Label: Ariola	—	—	—	—	—	—
1976	Black Gold	Released: 1976; Label: Dig-It, Trema	—	—	—	—	—	—
1981	Something Old Something New	Released: 1981; Label: CNR	—	—	—	—	—	—
1987	Today	Released: 1987; Label: Koch, Karussell; Re-recordings	—	—	—	—	—	—
1994	A New Chapter	Released: 1994; Label: Sm'Art Art	—	—	—	—	—	—
"—" denotes releases that did not chart or were not released in that territory

=== Compilation albums ===
Year	Title	Details	Peak chart positions	
Year	Title	Details	FIN	NL
1972	The Best of Middle of the Road	Released: 1972; Label: RCA	19	—
1977	Greatest Hits	Released: 1977; Label: RCA; Netherlands-only release	—	—
1986	Die großen Erfolge einer Supergruppe	Released: 1986; Label: SR International; Germany-only release	—	—
1989	The Very Best of Middle of the Road	Released: June 1989; Label: Dino Music	—	56
1989	Middle of the Road	Released: July 1989; Label: Ariola Express	—	—
1997	Greatest Hits	Released: 1997; Label: Pegasus	—	—
1999	Millennium Collection	Released: 1999; Label: Millennium	—	—
2002	The Best of Middle of the Road	Released: May 2002; Label: Camden/BMG	—	—
2010	The RCA Years	Released: 18 January 2010; Label: 7T's	—	—
"—" denotes releases that did not chart or were not released in that territory

== Singles ==
Year	Single	Peak chart positions										Album
Year	Single	UK	AUS	BEL (FL)	BEL (WA)	DEN	GER	NL	NOR	SA	SWI	Album
1970	"Chirpy Chirpy Cheep Cheep"	1	2	1	1	1	2	2	1	—	1	Chirpy Chirpy Cheep Cheep
1971	"Lo Schiaffo" (with Jordan; Italy-only release)	—	—	—	—	—	—	—	—	—	—	Non-album single
1971	"Tweedle Dee, Tweedle Dum"	2	15	7	16	1	15	7	6	5	—	Chirpy Chirpy Cheep Cheep
1971	"Soley Soley"	5	23	1	1	2	2	1	1	1	1	Acceleration
1971	"Sacramento (A Wonderful Town)"	23	79	1	1	2	1	1	1	3	1	Acceleration
1972	"Samson and Delilah"	26	—	1	2	5	2	1	11	5	3	Acceleration
1972	"Talk of All the USA"	—	—	19	—	—	—	—	—	9	—	Acceleration
1972	"Bottoms Up"	—	71	3	13	3	2	5	8	16	—	Drive On
1973	"Yellow Boomerang"	—	—	2	6	2	6	1	8	13	2	Drive On
1973	"Union Silver"	—	—	—	31	—	—	—	—	—	—	Drive On
1973	"Kailakee Kailako"	—	—	26	26	16	29	21	—	—	5	Drive On
1973	"Samba D'Amour"	—	—	—	—	20	35	—	—	—	—	Music Music
1974	"Honey No"	—	—	—	31	29	31	—	—	—	5	Drive On
1974	"Sole Giallo" (Italy-only release)	—	—	—	—	—	—	—	—	—	—	Non-album single
1974	"Rockin' Soul"	—	—	—	—	—	31	—	—	—	—	You Pays Yer Money and You Takes Yer Chance
1974	"Bonjour Ҫa Va"	—	—	—	—	—	—	—	—	—	—	Postcard
1975	"Happy Song"	—	—	—	—	—	—	—	—	—	—	Dice
1975	"Hitchin' a Ride in the Moonlight"	—	—	—	—	—	—	—	—	—	—	Dice
1976	"Bubblegum Baby" (France/Belgium-only release)	—	—	—	38	—	—	—	—	—	—	Black Gold
1976	"Everybody Loves a Winner"	—	—	—	—	—	43	—	—	—	—	Non-album single
1980	"Space Machine" (Netherlands-only release)	—	—	—	—	—	—	—	—	—	—	Something Old Something New
1980	"Sugar Jo Jo" (Netherlands and Germany-only release)	—	—	—	—	—	—	—	—	—	—	Something Old Something New
1980	"Steal a Piece of My Heart"	—	—	—	—	—	—	—	—	—	—	Something Old Something New
1981	"The Medley"	—	—	20	—	—	—	—	—	—	—	Something Old Something New
1982	"Jingle Jangle" (Netherlands-only release)	—	—	—	—	—	—	—	—	—	—	Non-album singles
1985	"Scotland's Coming Alive Again"	—	—	—	—	—	—	—	—	—	—	Non-album singles
1987	"Midnight Blue" (Austria-only release)	—	—	—	—	—	—	—	—	—	—	Today
1989	"One More Night" (Netherlands-only release)	—	—	—	—	—	—	—	—	—	—	The Very Best of Middle of the Road
"—" denotes releases that did not chart or were not released in that territory
