= VG-lista 1964 to 1994 =

Norwegian hit-chart summary list

This is a summary list of all the top singles in the VG-lista, the official Norwegian hit-chart, from 1964 to 1994. For detailed listings week by week for number-one positions from 1995 onwards, see List of number-one songs in Norway.

== 1964 ==
1. The Beatles - "She Loves You" (2 weeks)
2. The Beatles - "I Want to Hold Your Hand" (3 weeks)
3. The Swinging Blue Jeans - "Hippy Hippy Shake" (7 weeks)
4. Wenche Myhre - "La meg være ung" (5 weeks)
5. Jim Reeves - "I Love You Because" (13 weeks)
6. The Beatles - "A Hard Day's Night" (1 week)
7. Jim Reeves - "I Won't Forget You" (9 weeks)
8. The Beatles - "I Should Have Known Better" (2 weeks)
9. Roy Orbison - "Oh Pretty Woman" (5 weeks)
10. The Beatles - "If I Fell" (2 weeks)
11. The Beatles - "I Feel Fine" (6 weeks)

== 1965 ==
1. Sven-Ingvars - "Fröken Fräken" (8 weeks)
2. The Beatles - "Rock and Roll Music" (3 weeks)
3. The Rolling Stones - "The Last Time" (1 week)
4. France Gall - "Poupée de cire, poupée de son" (1 week)
5. The Beatles - "Ticket to Ride" (4 weeks)
6. Roger Miller - "King of the Road" (4 weeks)
7. Jailbird Singers - "Där björkarna susa" (1 week)
8. Hep Stars - "Cadillac" (1 week)
9. Elvis Presley - "Crying in the Chapel" (2 weeks)
10. The Spotnicks - "Blue Blue Day" (4 weeks)
11. The Beatles - "Help!" (6 weeks)
12. The Rolling Stones - "(I Can't Get No) Satisfaction" (5 weeks)
13. Barry McGuire - "Eve of Destruction" (2 weeks)
14. The Beatles - "Yesterday" (5 weeks)
15. The Beatles - "Day Tripper" (7 weeks)

== 1966 ==
1. Barry McGuire - "You Were on My Mind" (1 week)
2. The Overlanders - "Michelle" (1 week)
3. The Beatles - "Michelle" (9 weeks)
4. The Beach Boys - "Barbara Ann" (4 weeks)
5. The Beach Boys - "Sloop John B" (5 weeks)
6. The Beatles - "Paperback Writer" (4 weeks)
7. The Kinks - "Sunny Afternoon" (4 weeks)
8. The Beatles - "Yellow Submarine/Eleanor Rigby" (7 weeks)
9. Sonny & Cher - "Little Man" (6 weeks)
10. Herman's Hermits - "No Milk Today" (8 weeks)

== 1967 ==
1. Tom Jones - "Green, Green Grass of Home" (1 week)
2. The Monkees - "I'm a Believer" (6 weeks)
3. The Beatles - "Penny Lane/Strawberry Fields Forever" (6 weeks)
4. Sandie Shaw - "Puppet on a String" (6 weeks)
5. Nancy Sinatra & Frank Sinatra - "Somethin' Stupid" (3 weeks)
6. The Monkees - "Theme From The Monkees" (4 weeks)
7. The Tremeloes - "Silence Is Golden" (1 week)
8. The Beatles - "All You Need Is Love" (4 weeks)
9. Scott McKenzie - "San Francisco (Be Sure to Wear Flowers in Your Hair)" (10 weeks)
10. Box Tops - "The Letter" (3 weeks)
11. Bee Gees - "Massachusetts" (3 weeks)
12. Sven-Ingvars - "Önskebrunnen" (1 week)
13. The Beatles - "Hello, Goodbye" (5 weeks)

== 1968 ==
1. Anna-Lena Löfgren - "Lyckliga Gatan" (12 weeks)
2. Cliff Richard - "Congratulations" (9 weeks)
3. Gary Puckett & The Union Gap - "Young Girl" (6 weeks)
4. Gunnar Wicklund - "Vi skal gå hand i hand" (3 weeks)
5. Nancy Sinatra & Dean Martin - "Things" (2 weeks)
6. Inger Lise Andersen - "Romeo og Julie" (3 weeks)
7. The Beatles - "Hey Jude/Revolution" (6 weeks)
8. Mary Hopkin - "Those Were The Days" (2 weeks)
9. Gluntan - "Langs hver en vei" (1 week)
10. Inger Lise Andersen - "Fru Johnsen" (9 weeks)

== 1969 ==
1. Marmalade - "Ob-La-Di, Ob-La-Da" (8 weeks)
2. Kirsti Sparboe - "Oj, Oj, Oj, Så Glad Jeg Skal Bli" (4 weeks)
3. Lulu - "Boom Bang-a-Bang" (3 weeks)
4. The Beatles - "Get Back" (6 weeks)
5. The Beatles - "The Ballad of John and Yoko" (3 weeks)
6. Elvis Presley - "In the Ghetto" (7 weeks)
7. Zager & Evans - "In the Year 2525" (4 weeks)
8. Jane Birkin & Serge Gainsbourg - "Je t'aime... moi non plus" (8 weeks)
9. The Archies - "Sugar, Sugar" (10 weeks)

== 1970 ==
1. B.J. Thomas - "Raindrops Keep Falling on My Head" (4 weeks)
2. Stevie Wonder - "Yester-Me, Yester-You, Yesterday" (5 weeks)
3. The Beatles - "Let It Be" (5 weeks)
4. Frijid Pink - "The House of the Rising Sun" (7 weeks)
5. Christie - "Yellow River" (3 weeks)
6. Mungo Jerry - "In the Summertime" (7 weeks)
7. The Beach Boys - "Cottonfields" (3 weeks)
8. Anita Hegerland - "Mitt sommarlov" (3 weeks)
9. Creedence Clearwater Revival - "Lookin' Out My Back Door" (4 weeks)
10. Gro Anita Schønn - "En enkel sang om frihet" (8 weeks)

== 1971 ==
1. Neil Diamond - "Cracklin' Rosie" (5 weeks)
2. George Harrison - "My Sweet Lord" (8 weeks)
3. Lynn Anderson - "(I Never Promised You a) Rose Garden" (14 weeks)
4. Middle of the Road - "Chirpy Chirpy Cheep Cheep" (11 weeks)
5. Ocean - "Put Your Hand in the Hand" (6 weeks)
6. Pop Tops - "Mamy Blue" (5 weeks)
7. Middle of the Road - "Soley Soley" (7 weeks)

== 1972 ==
1. Middle of the Road - "Sacramento" (9 weeks)
2. New Seekers - "Beg, Steal or Borrow" (8 weeks)
3. Ann-Louise Hanson - "Tag emot en utsträckt hand" (5 weeks)
4. Stein Ingebrigtsen - "Cento Campane" (6 weeks)
5. Daniel Boone - "Beautiful Sunday" (1 week)
6. Hot Butter - "Popcorn" (9 weeks)
7. Gilbert O'Sullivan - "Matrimony" (1 week)
8. Gilbert O'Sullivan - "Clair" (9 weeks)

== 1973 ==
1. Wenche Myhre - "Jeg og du og vi to" (14 weeks)
2. Cliff Richard - "Power to All Our Friends" (8 weeks)
3. Dawn - "Tie a Yellow Ribbon Round the Ole Oak Tree" (8 weeks)
4. Stein Ingebrigtsen - "Bare du" (3 weeks)
5. Albert Hammond - "Free Electric Band" (7 weeks)
6. Lillebjørn Nilsen - "Barn av regnbuen" (11 weeks)

== 1974 ==
1. The Rolling Stones - "Angie" (2 weeks)
2. Inger Lise Rypdal - "En spennende dag for Josefine" (8 weeks)
3. Suzi Quatro - "Devil Gate Drive" (1 week)
4. ABBA - "Waterloo" (8 weeks)
5. Terry Jacks - "Seasons in the Sun" (12 weeks)
6. Terry Jacks - "If You Go Away" (4 weeks)
7. George McCrae - "Rock Your Baby" (2 weeks)
8. Hans Petter Hansen - "Jeg kommer snart igjen" (15 weeks)

== 1975 ==
1. Slade - "Far Far Away" (4 weeks)
2. Billy Swan - "I Can Help" (10 weeks)
3. Teach-In - "Ding-A-Dong" (8 weeks)
4. Nazareth - "Love Hurts" (14 weeks)
5. George Baker Selection - "Paloma Blanca" (8 weeks)
6. Rod Stewart - "Sailing" (18 weeks)

== 1976 ==
1. Roger Whittaker - "The Last Farewell" (3 weeks)
2. Harpo - "Movie Star" (11 weeks)
3. Brotherhood of Man - "Save Your Kisses for Me" (10 weeks)
4. ABBA - "Dancing Queen" (12 weeks)
5. Pussycat - "Mississippi" (8 weeks)

== 1977 ==
1. Boney M. - "Daddy Cool" (10 weeks)
2. Smokie - "Living Next Door To Alice" (12 weeks)
3. Boney M - "Ma Baker" (9 weeks)
4. The Manhattan Transfer - "Chanson D'Amour" (2 weeks)
5. Baccara - "Yes Sir, I Can Boogie" (22 weeks)
6. Baccara - "Sorry, I'm a Lady" (1 week)

== 1978 ==
1. Baccara - "Darling" (2 weeks)
2. Bonnie Tyler - "It's a Heartache" (13 weeks)
3. Jahn Teigen - "Mil etter mil" (5 weeks)
4. Boney M - "Rivers of Babylon" (6 weeks)
5. John Travolta & Olivia Newton-John - "You're the One That I Want" (18 weeks)
6. Geir Børresen & Smurfene - "Smurfesangen" (9 weeks)

== 1979 ==
1. Bee Gees - "Too Much Heaven" (8 weeks)
2. Frankie Miller - "Darlin'" (3 weeks)
3. Milk and Honey - "Hallelujah" (11 weeks)
4. Anita Ward - "Ring My Bell" (3 weeks)
5. Patrick Hernandez - "Born to Be Alive" (4 weeks)
6. Frank Zappa - "Bobby Brown" (11 weeks)
7. Cliff Richard - "We Don't Talk Anymore" (11 weeks)

== 1980 ==
1. Michael Jackson - "Don't Stop 'Til You Get Enough" (2 weeks)
2. Pink Floyd - "Another Brick in the Wall, Part II" (10 weeks)
3. Sverre Kjelsberg & Mattis Hætta - "Sámiid Ædnan" (4 weeks)
4. Johnny Logan - "What's Another Year" (8 weeks)
5. Olivia Newton-John & Electric Light Orchestra - "Xanadu" (6 weeks)
6. Lipps Inc - "Funkytown" (2 weeks)
7. The Kids - "Hun er forelska i lærer'n" (7 weeks)
8. Diana Ross - "Upside Down" (2 weeks)
9. Ottawan - "D.I.S.C.O." (2 weeks)
10. Barbra Streisand - "Woman in Love" (12 weeks)

== 1981 ==
1. Lars Kilevold - "Livet er for kjipt" (5 weeks)
2. Gyllene Tider - "När vi två blir en" (3 weeks)
3. Jannicke - "Svake mennesker" (14 weeks)
4. Jon English and Mario Millo - "Against the Wind"/"Six Ribbons" (6 weeks)
5. Beranek - "Dra til hælvete" (1 week)
6. Caramba - "Hubba Hubba Zoot-Zoot" (4 weeks)
7. Kim Carnes - "Bette Davis Eyes" (1 week)
8. Sheena Easton - "For Your Eyes Only" (7 weeks)
9. Ottawan - "Hands Up (Give Me Your Heart)" (4 weeks)

== 1982 ==
1. Casino Steel & Gary Holton - "Ruby, Don't Take Your Love to Town" (4 weeks)
2. Electronicas - "Dance Little Bird" (4 weeks)
3. Shakin' Stevens - "Oh Julie" (6 weeks)
4. Christopher Cross - "Arthur's Theme (Best That You Can Do)" (2 weeks)
5. The Human League - "Don't You Want Me" (2 weeks)
6. Paul McCartney & Stevie Wonder - "Ebony and Ivory" (8 weeks)
7. Nicole - "Ein Bißchen Frieden" (1 week)
8. David Bowie - "Cat People (Putting Out Fire)" (9 weeks)
9. Survivor - "Eye of the Tiger" (8 weeks)
10. Bolland & Bolland - "You're In the Army Now" (6 weeks)
11. F. R. David - "Words" (14 weeks)

== 1983 ==
1. Renée and Renato - "Save Your Love" (6 weeks)
2. David Bowie - "Let's Dance" (6 weeks)
3. Carola - "Främling" (1 week)
4. Bonnie Tyler - "Total Eclipse of the Heart" (5 weeks)
5. Agnetha Fältskog - "The Heat is On" (2 weeks)
6. Mike Oldfield - "Moonlight Shadow" (6 weeks)
7. Irene Cara - "Flashdance... What a Feeling" (4 weeks)
8. The Monroes - "Sunday People" (5 weeks)
9. Paul McCartney & Michael Jackson - "Say Say Say" (5 weeks)
10. Culture Club - "Karma Chameleon" ( 1 week)
11. Tracey Ullman - "They Don't Know" (8 weeks)

== 1984 ==
1. Matthew Wilder - "Break My Stride" (3 weeks)
2. Slade - "My Oh My" (4 weeks)
3. Cyndi Lauper - "Girls Just Want to Have Fun" (2 weeks)
4. Mel Brooks - "To Be or Not To Be" (4 weeks)
5. Break Machine - "Street Dance" (5 weeks)
6. Phil Collins - "Against All Odds" (4 weeks)
7. Wham! - "Wake Me Up Before You Go-Go" (9 weeks)
8. Stevie Wonder - "I Just Called to Say I Love You" (10 weeks)
9. Wham! - "Freedom" (1 week)
10. Limahl - "Neverending Story" (8 weeks)

== 1985 ==
1. Band Aid - "Do They Know It's Christmas?" (3 weeks)
2. Foreigner - "I Want to Know What Love Is" (5 weeks)
3. VideoKids - "Woodpeckers from Space" (2 weeks)
4. USA for Africa - "We Are the World" (10 weeks)
5. Bobbysocks - "La det swinge" (1 week)
6. Paul Hardcastle - "19" (7 weeks)
7. Sandra - "Maria Magdalena" (4 weeks)
8. Eurythmics - "There Must Be An Angel" (1 week)
9. The Monroes - "Cheerio" (7 weeks)
10. a-ha - "Take On Me" (2 weeks)
11. Modern Talking - "Cheri Cheri Lady" (1 week)
12. Jennifer Rush - "Power of Love" (4 weeks)
13. Lionel Richie - "Say You, Say Me" (9 weeks)

== 1986 ==
1. Pet Shop Boys - "West End Girls" (2 weeks)
2. Bobbysocks - "Waiting for the Morning" (1 week)
3. Billy Ocean - "When the Going Gets Tough" (8 weeks)
4. Mr. Mister - "Kyrie" (1 week)
5. George Michael - "A Different Corner" (3 weeks)
6. Hear 'n Aid - "Stars" (2 weeks)
7. Falco - "Jeanny" (4 weeks)
8. Samantha Fox - "Touch Me (I Want Your Body)" (4 weeks)
9. Madonna - "Papa Don't Preach" (4 weeks)
10. Lionel Richie - "Dancing on the Ceiling" (1 week)
11. Chris de Burgh - "The Lady in Red" (5 weeks)
12. a-ha - "I've Been Losing You" (4 weeks)
13. Cutting Crew - "(I Just) Died in Your Arms" (4 weeks)
14. Bob Geldof - "This is the World Calling" (7 weeks)

== 1987 ==
1. Bon Jovi - "Livin' on a Prayer" (3 weeks)
2. Kim Wilde - "You Keep Me Hangin' On" (3 weeks)
3. Gary Moore - "Over the Hills and Far Away" (7 weeks)
4. Boy George - "Everything I Own" (2 weeks)
5. Ferry Aid - "Let It Be" (4 weeks)
6. Whitney Houston - "I Wanna Dance With Somebody" (7 weeks)
7. a-ha - "The Living Daylights" (3 weeks)
8. Michael Jackson - "I Just Can't Stop Loving You" (7 weeks)
9. Pet Shop Boys - "It's a Sin" (1 week)
10. Desireless - "Voyage Voyage" (2 weeks)
11. Bruce Springsteen - "Brilliant Disguise" (2 weeks)
12. Rick Astley - "Never Gonna Give You Up" (1 week)
13. Bee Gees - "You Win Again" (5 weeks)
14. T'Pau - "China in Your Hand" (7 weeks)

== 1988 ==
1. Belinda Carlisle - "Heaven Is a Place on Earth" (4 weeks)
2. Billy Ocean - "Get Outta My Dreams, Get into My Car" (4 weeks)
3. a-ha - "Stay on These Roads" (6 weeks)
4. Prince - "Alphabet St." (6 weeks)
5. Ofra Haza - "Im Nin'Alu" (4 weeks)
6. Tindrum - "Drums of War" (2 weeks)
7. Viggo Sandvik - "Fisking i Valdres" (3 weeks)
8. Europe - "Superstitious" (3 weeks)
9. Transvision Vamp - "I Want Your Love" (1 week)
10. Vidar Theisen & The Retrievers - "Heavy Metal" (4 weeks)
11. Koreana - "Hand in Hand" (4 weeks)
12. One 2 Many - "Downtown" (5 weeks)
13. Sam Brown - "Stop!" (1 week)

== 1989 ==
1. Robin Beck - "First Time" (4 weeks)
2. Will To Power - "Baby, I Love Your Way" (7 weeks)
3. Paula Abdul - "Straight Up" (1 week)
4. Madonna - "Like a Prayer" (5 weeks)
5. Roxette - "The Look" (8 weeks)
6. The Bangles - "Eternal Flame" (2 weeks)
7. Prince - "Batdance" (2 weeks)
8. Franklin - "Bombadilla Life" (8 weeks)
9. Jive Bunny and the Mastermixers - "Swing the Mood" (6 weeks)
10. Kaoma - "Lambada" (7 weeks)
11. Phil Collins - "Another Day in Paradise" (6 weeks)

== 1990 ==
1. Lisa Stansfield - "All Around the World" (3 weeks)
2. Sinéad O'Connor - "Nothing Compares 2 U" (10 weeks)
3. Madonna - "Vogue" (3 weeks)
4. Alannah Myles - "Black Velvet" (8 weeks)
5. Roxette - "It Must Have Been Love" (12 weeks)
6. a-ha - "Crying in the Rain" (7 weeks)
7. Maria McKee - "Show Me Heaven" (9 weeks)

== 1991 ==
1. Enigma - "Sadeness (Part I)" (3 weeks)
2. Inner Circle - "Bad Boys" (3 weeks)
3. The Simpsons - "Do the Bartman" (1 week)
4. Roxette - "Joyride" (7 weeks)
5. Cher - "The Shoop Shoop Song" (4 weeks)
6. Scorpions - "Wind of Change" (2 weeks)
7. Zucchero & Paul Young - "Senza una donna" (4 weeks)
8. Bryan Adams - "(Everything I Do) I Do It for You" (17 weeks)
9. U2 - "The Fly" (1 week)
10. Michael Jackson - "Black or White" (6 weeks)

== 1992 ==
1. George Michael & Elton John - "Don't Let the Sun Go Down on Me" (6 weeks)
2. Ten Sharp - "You" (1 week)
3. Go-Go Gorilla - "Mother Porno" (1 week)
4. Go-Go Gorilla - "Go-Go Gorilla" (3 weeks)
5. Bruce Springsteen - "Human Touch" (4 weeks)
6. Mr Big - "To Be with You" (8 weeks)
7. U96 - "Das Boot" (1 week)
8. Maggie Reilly - "Everytime We Touch" (8 weeks)
9. Roxette - "How Do You Do!" (5 weeks)
10. Michael Learns To Rock - "The Actor" (7 weeks)
11. Bon Jovi - "Keep the Faith" (5 weeks)
12. Ace of Base - "Wheel of Fortune" (4 weeks)

== 1993 ==
1. Whitney Houston - "I Will Always Love You" (8 weeks)
2. 2 Unlimited - "No Limit" (7 weeks)
3. Snow - "Informer" (6 weeks)
4. Haddaway - "What Is Love" (8 weeks)
5. Culture Beat - "Mr. Vain" (2 weeks)
6. 4 Non Blondes - "What's Up" (11 weeks)
7. Freddie Mercury - "Living on My Own" (2 weeks)
8. Meat Loaf - "I'd Do Anything for Love (But I Won't Do That)" (5 weeks)
9. Bryan Adams - "Please Forgive Me" (4 weeks)

== 1994 ==
1. Aerosmith - "Cryin'" (1 week)
2. Bryan Adams, Rod Stewart & Sting - "All For Love" (6 weeks)
3. Sissel Kyrkjebø - "Se ilden lyse" (3 weeks)
4. Enigma - "Return to Innocence" (6 weeks)
5. Bruce Springsteen - "Streets of Philadelphia" (6 weeks)
6. Beck - "Loser" (3 weeks)
7. Crash Test Dummies - "Mmm Mmm Mmm Mmm" (6 weeks)
8. Wet Wet Wet - "Love Is All Around" (11 weeks)
9. Rednex - "Cotton Eye Joe" (14 weeks)
