= List of number-one singles from 1968 to 1979 (Switzerland) =

This is a list of singles that reached number one on the Swiss Hitparade from 1968 through 1979.

== Number-one singles ==
Key
†	Number-one song of the year

Issue date	Song	Artist	Weeks at number one
1968
2 January	"Monja"†	Roland W.	5
6 February	"Judy in Disguise"	John Fred & His Playboy Band	5
12 March	"Words"	Bee Gees	2
26 March	"Lady Madonna"	The Beatles	4
23 April	"Delilah"	Tom Jones	8
18 June	"A Man Without Love"	Engelbert Humperdinck	6
30 July	"Heavenly Club"	Les Sauterelles	6
10 September	"Hey Jude"	The Beatles	6
22 October	"Those Were the Days"	Mary Hopkin	6
3 December	"With a Little Help from My Friends"	Joe Cocker	1
10 December	"My Little Lady"	The Tremeloes	1
17 December	"Eloise"† (1969)	Barry Ryan	6
1969
28 January	"Ob-La-Di, Ob-La-Da"	The Beatles	6
11 March	"Crimson and Clover"	Tommy James and the Shondells	2
25 March	"Atlantis"	Donovan	4
22 April	"Sorry Suzanne"	The Hollies	2
6 May	"Get Back / Don't Let Me Down"	The Beatles with Billy Preston	4
3 June	"Mendocino"	Sir Douglas Quintet	1
10 June	"Ballad of John and Yoko"	The Beatles	2
24 June	"Mendocino"	Sir Douglas Quintet	3
15 July	"Oh Happy Day"	The Edwin Hawkins Singers	1
22 July	"Mendocino"	Sir Douglas Quintet	1
29 July	"Honky Tonk Women"	The Rolling Stones	4
26 August	"In the Year 2525"	Zager and Evans	1
2 September	"Je t'aime... moi non plus"	Serge Gainsbourg and Jane Birkin	8
28 October	"Grüezi wohl, Frau Stirnimaa"	Die Minstrels	10
1970
6 January	"Venus"	The Shocking Blue	4
3 February	"Na Na Hey Hey Kiss Him Goodbye"	Steam	5
10 March	"Let It Be"	The Beatles	7
28 April	"Mademoiselle Ninette"	Soulful Dynamics	8
23 June	"El Cóndor Pasa"	Simon and Garfunkel	9
25 August	"In the Summertime"	Mungo Jerry	4
22 September	"A Song of Joy"†	Miguel Ríos	7
10 November	"Black Night"	Deep Purple	4
8 December	"San Bernadino"	Christie	6
1971
19 January	"My Sweet Lord"	George Harrison	5
23 February	"Butterfly"	Danyel Gérard	6
6 April	"What Is Life"	George Harrison	1
13 April	"(I Never Promised You a) Rose Garden"	Lynn Anderson	7
1 June	"Brown Sugar"	The Rolling Stones	1
8 June	"Chirpy Chirpy Cheep Cheep"†	Middle of the Road	9
10 August	"Sweet Hitch-Hiker"	Creedence Clearwater Revival	3
31 August	"Co-Co"	Sweet	6
12 October	"Mamy Blue"	Pop Tops	10
21 December	"Akropolis adieu"	Mireille Mathieu	3
1972
11 January	"Soley Soley"	Middle of the Road	3
1 February	"I Will Return"	Springwater	1
8 February	"Sacramento"	Middle of the Road	6
21 March	"How Do You Do"	Mouth & MacNeal	5
25 April	"Après toi"	Vicky Leandros	7
13 June	"One Way Wind"	The Cats	5
18 July	"Song Sung Blue"	Neil Diamond	4
22 August	"Popcorn"†	Hot Butter	10
31 October	"Silver Machine"	Hawkwind	3
21 November	"Mexico"	Les Humphries Singers	9
1973
23 January	"Ich fange nie mehr was an einem Sonntag an"	Monica Morell	5
27 February	"Crocodile Rock"	Elton John	3
20 March	"Mama Loo"	Les Humphries Singers	5
24 April	"Der Junge mit der Mundharmonika"	Bernd Clüver	7
12 June	"Goodbye, My Love, Goodbye"†	Demis Roussos	12
12 September	"Can the Can"	Suzi Quatro	6
24 October	"Angie"	The Rolling Stones	4
21 November	"I'd Love You to Want Me"	Lobo	12
1974
20 February	"Kansas City"	Les Humphries Singers	4
20 March	"Tchip Tchip"	Cash & Carry	5
24 April	"Waterloo"	ABBA	9
26 June	"Seasons in the Sun"†	Terry Jacks	3
17 July	"Sugar Baby Love"	The Rubettes	8
11 September	"Rock Your Baby"	George McCrae	6
23 October	"Gigi l'amoroso"	Dalida	2
6 November	"I'm Leaving It All Up to You"	Donny Osmond and Marie Osmond	12
1975
31 January	"I Can Help"	Billy Swan	6
14 March	"Longfellow Serenade"	Neil Diamond	1
21 March	"I Can Help"	Billy Swan	1
4 April	"Griechischer Wein"	Udo Jürgens	2
18 April	"Ding-A-Dong"	Teach-In	5
23 May	"I Do, I Do, I Do, I Do, I Do"	ABBA	5
27 June	"Only You Can"	Fox	2
11 July	"Paloma Blanca"	George Baker Selection	8
5 September	"Tornerò"†	I Santo California	6
17 October	"Dolannes-Melodie"	Jean-Claude Borelly	16
1976
6 February	"Mamma Mia"	ABBA	2
20 February	"Moviestar"	Harpo	5
26 March	"Mississippi"	Pussycat	1
2 April	"Fernando"†	ABBA	11
25 June	"Let Your Love Flow"	The Bellamy Brothers	5
30 July	"Die kleine Kneipe"	Peter Alexander	5
3 September	"Verde"	Ricky King	6
15 October	"Daddy Cool"	Boney M.	14
1977
22 January	"Anita"	Costa Cordalis	3
12 February	"Living Next Door to Alice"†	Smokie	7
2 April	"Swiss Lady"	Pepe Lienhard Band	8
4 June	"Rock Bottom"	Lynsey de Paul and Mike Moran	2
18 June	"Ma Baker"	Boney M.	3
9 July	"Yes Sir, I Can Boogie"	Baccara	8
3 September	"Magic Fly"	Space	2
17 September	"Ti amo"	Umberto Tozzi	6
5 November	"Ballade pour Adeline"	Richard Clayderman	2
19 November	"Belfast"	Boney M.	10
1978
28 January	"Mull of Kintyre"	Wings	10
15 April	"Rivers of Babylon"†	Boney M.	14
22 July	"Tu"	Umberto Tozzi	5
2 September	"Ça plane pour moi"	Plastic Bertrand	1
9 September	"You're the One That I Want"	John Travolta and Olivia Newton-John	7
28 October	"Mama Leone"	Bino	4
26 November	"You're the Greatest Lover"	Luv'	3
17 December	"Mary's Boy Child – Oh My Lord"	Boney M.	5
1979
21 January	"Y.M.C.A."	Village People	8
18 March	"Chiquitita"	ABBA	2
1 April	"Heart of Glass"	Blondie	3
22 April	"One Way Ticket"	Eruption	4
20 May	"Music Box Dancer"	Frank Mills	5
24 June	"Hot Stuff"	Donna Summer	1
1 July	"Pop Muzik"	M	3
22 July	"Gloria"	Umberto Tozzi	4
19 August	"Tu sei l'unica donna per me"	Alan Sorrenti	9
21 October	"We Don't Talk Anymore"	Cliff Richard	6
2 December	"Gimme! Gimme! Gimme! (A Man After Midnight)"	ABBA	1
9 December	"Video Killed the Radio Star"	The Buggles	2
23 December	"Todesengel"	Frank Duval	4

== See also ==
- 1968 in music
- 1969 in music
- 1970s in music
