= List of number-one hits of 1972 (Argentina) =

This is a list of the songs that reached number one in Argentina in 1972, according to Billboard magazine with data provided by Rubén Machado's "Escalera a la fama".

Issue date	Song	Artist(s)
January 1	"The Fool"	Gilbert Montagné
January 8	"The Fool"	Gilbert Montagné
January 22	"El Frescales"	Luis Aguilé
February 5	"El Frescales"	Luis Aguilé
March 11	"El Frescales"	Luis Aguilé
March 18	"Rosas a Sandra"	Sabú
March 25	"Rosas a Sandra"	Sabú
April 8	"Rosas a Sandra"	Sabú
April 22	"Poppa Joe"	The Sweet/Freedom
May 6	"Poppa Joe"	The Sweet/Freedom
May 20	"Poppa Joe"	The Sweet/Freedom
June 3	"Son of My Father"	Chicory Tip/Los Principales
June 10	"El golpe traidor"	Los Saylors/Carlitos Almeira/Pepito Pérez
June 17	"Un gato en la oscuridad"	Roberto Carlos
June 24	"Un gato en la oscuridad"	Roberto Carlos
July 15	"Un gato en la oscuridad"	Roberto Carlos
August 19	"Love Theme from "The Godfather""	Soundtrack from "The Godfather"/Andy Williams/ Roger Williams/Alain Debray/Johnny Mathis
September 9	"La aventura"	José María y Elena/Paulo Miró/Stone et Charden
September 16	"La aventura"	José María y Elena/Paulo Miró/Stone et Charden
September 30	"La aventura"	José María y Elena/Paulo Miró/Stone et Charden
October 7	"La aventura"	José María y Elena/Paulo Miró/Stone et Charden
October 14	"Yo te quiero, nos queremos"	Juan Marcelo
December 2	"Alone Again (Naturally)"	Gilbert O'Sullivan/Teddy Brando
December 9	"Vagabundo"	Manolo Galván/Amadeo
December 23	"Bottoms Up"	Middle of the Road/Flash/Bárbara y Dick

== See also ==
- 1972 in music
