= List of songs recorded by JBO =

JBO is a heavy metal band from Erlangen, Germany. The band is most known for their parodies of rock and pop songs. The band has written more of its own songs since 2000, but continues to produce parodies, which they refer to as "Blöedsinn" – an intentional misspelling of "Blödsinn" which means "nonsense" or "stupidity" in German.

== Cover versions and parodies ==
Song	Album(s)	Original or parody
"Ace of Spades (umgepflügt)"		Parody of "Ace of Spades" by Motörhead, same lyrics performed in an unplugged manner.
"Always Look on the Dark Side of Life"		Parody of "Always Look on the Bright Side of Life" by Monty Python
"Angie"		Parody of "Angie" by The Rolling Stones
"Angie (Quit Living on Dreams)"		Parody of "Jeanny" by Falco, in reference to Angela Merkel.
"Arschloch und Spaß dabei" (Asshole and enjoying it)		Parody of "Fire Water Burn" by Bloodhound Gang
"Diggin' the Nose (Hier bohrt der Boss noch selbst)" (Here drills the boss still by himself)		Parody of "Born in the U.S.A." by Bruce Springsteen
"Dio in Rio"		Parody of "Pogo in Togo" by United Balls
"Ein bißchen Frieden" (A little bit of peace)		Parody of "Ein bißchen Frieden" by Nicole, in the style of Rammstein.
"Ein Fest" (A party)		Cover of "Go West" by Village People
"Ejaculatio praecox"		Parody of "Smells Like Teen Spirit" by Nirvana
"Fahrende Musikanten" (Travelling musicians)		Cover of "Fahrende Musikanten" by Nina & Mike, in a different style.
"Frauen" (Women)		Parody of "Männer" by Herbert Grönemeyer
"Fränkisches Bier" (Frankonian Beer)		Parody of "Griechischer Wein" (Greek Wine) by Udo Jürgens
"Geh mer halt zu Slayer" (Let's go to Slayer)		Parody of "Vamos a la Playa" by Righeira
"Gimme Doop Joanna" (Gimme Dope Joanna)		Parody of "Gimme Hope Jo'anna" by Eddy Grant
"Hasch" (Cannabis)		"Tush" by ZZ Top
"Girls, Girls, Girls"		Cover of "Girls Girls Girls" by Sailor
"Head Bang Boing"		Parody of "Bongo Bong" by Manu Chao
"Ich glaube du liebst mich nicht mehr" (I believe you don't love me anymore)		Parody of "You Don't Love Me Anymore" by "Weird Al" Yankovic
"Ich möcht so gerne Metal hör'n" (I wanna listen to metal)		Parody of "Ich möcht so gern Dave Dudley hör'n" by Truck Stop
"Ich sag JB ihr sagt O!"		Parody of "Wot! (He says Captain, I say Wot!)" by Captain Sensible
"Ich vermisse meine Hölle" (I miss my hell)		Parody of "Ich vermiss dich wie die Hölle" by Zlatko,*
"I Don't Like Metal"		"Dreadlock Holiday" by 10cc
"Im Verkehr" (In the traffic)		Parody of "In Zaire" by Johnny Wakelin. The title is a German double entendre of "Verkehr", which means traffic or also sexual intercourse. The meaning of the title in the context of the song's lyrics is thus best approximated as "having intercourse".
"Ist da irgendjemand da" (Is there anybody there)		Cover of "Is There Anybody There" by Scorpions
"J.B.O."		"Carry On" by Manowar
"Ka Alde, ka G'schrei" (No girlfriend, no shouting)		Parody of "No Woman, No Cry" by Bob Marley
"Könige" (Kings)		"König von Deutschland" (King of Germany) by Rio Reiser
"Lieber Fieber" (Rather Fever)		Parody of "Fever" by Peggy Lee
"Mei Alde is im Playboy drin" (My girlfriend is in Playboy)		"Centerfold" by The J. Geils Band
"M.E.T.A.L."		"D.I.S.C.O." by Ottawan
"Mir sta'dd'n 'etz die Feier" (Now we're getting the party started)		Cover of "We Didn't Start the Fire" by Billy Joel
"Musiker" (Musician)		"Moviestar" by Harpo
"Noch ein Meister" (Another master)		"Shadow on the Wall" by Mike Oldfield
"No Sleep 'til Bruck"		Parody of "No Sleep 'til Brooklyn" by Beastie Boys
"Oaargh!"		"Nur ein Wort" by Wir sind Helden
"Osama"		Parody of "Rosanna" by Toto
"Pabbarotti & Friends: Roots Bloody Roots"		Parody of "Roots Bloody Roots" by Sepultura. It has the same lyrics, except some parts are sung in the style of Pavarotti & Friends.
"Rache!" (Revenge!)		"Nightshift" by Commodores. "er hat 'neig'schifft" - he pissed into it [e.g. beer].
"Raining Blood"		"It's Raining Men" by The Weather Girls. Only the word "men" is replaced by "blood"
"Rauch auf'm Wasser" (Smoke on the Water)		Parody of "Smoke on the Water" by Deep Purple
"Rock Muzik"		Parody of "Pop Muzik" by M
"Rock Muzik" (English Version)		M, "Pop Muzik"
"Satan ist wieder da" (Satan is back again)		Parody of "Tarzan ist wieder da" by Willem
"Schlaf Kindlein, schlaf" (Sleep, little child, sleep)		Parody of "Enter Sandman" by Metallica
"Schlumpfozid im Stadgebiet" (Smurphocide in the heart of the city)		Parody of "Das Lied der Schlümpfe" by Vader Abraham
"Skorpione - vom Winde verdreht" (Scorpions - turned around by the wind)		"Rock You Like a Hurricane" by Scorpions
"Socken kauf ich nur noch beim Wöhrl" (I will buy socks only at Wöhrl store)		"Rockin' All Over the World" by Status Quo
"Symphonie der Verstopfung" (Symphony of constipation)		"Symphony of Destruction" by Megadeth
"Tschibum"		Parody of "Sch-Bum (S Leb'n is wiar a Traum)" by Spider Murphy Gang
"Tutti Frutti"		Cover of "Tutti Frutti" by Little Richard
"Vanhalien Harmonists: Jump"		A Cappella cover of "Jump" by Van Halen
"Walk with an Erection"		"Walk Like an Egyptian" by The Bangles, with elements from "Gehn wie ein Ägypter" by Die Ärzte, which is an earlier German cover version.
"Wessi-Girl" (West German Girl)		"Jessies Girl" by Rick Springfield
"Wir ham' ne Party" (We're having a party)		Parody of "Everybody (Backstreet's Back)" by Backstreet Boys
"Wir sind die Champignons" (We are the mushrooms)		Parody of "We Are the Champions" by Queen
(Alles Nur Geklaut)		JBO (band)
