= Sally Carr =

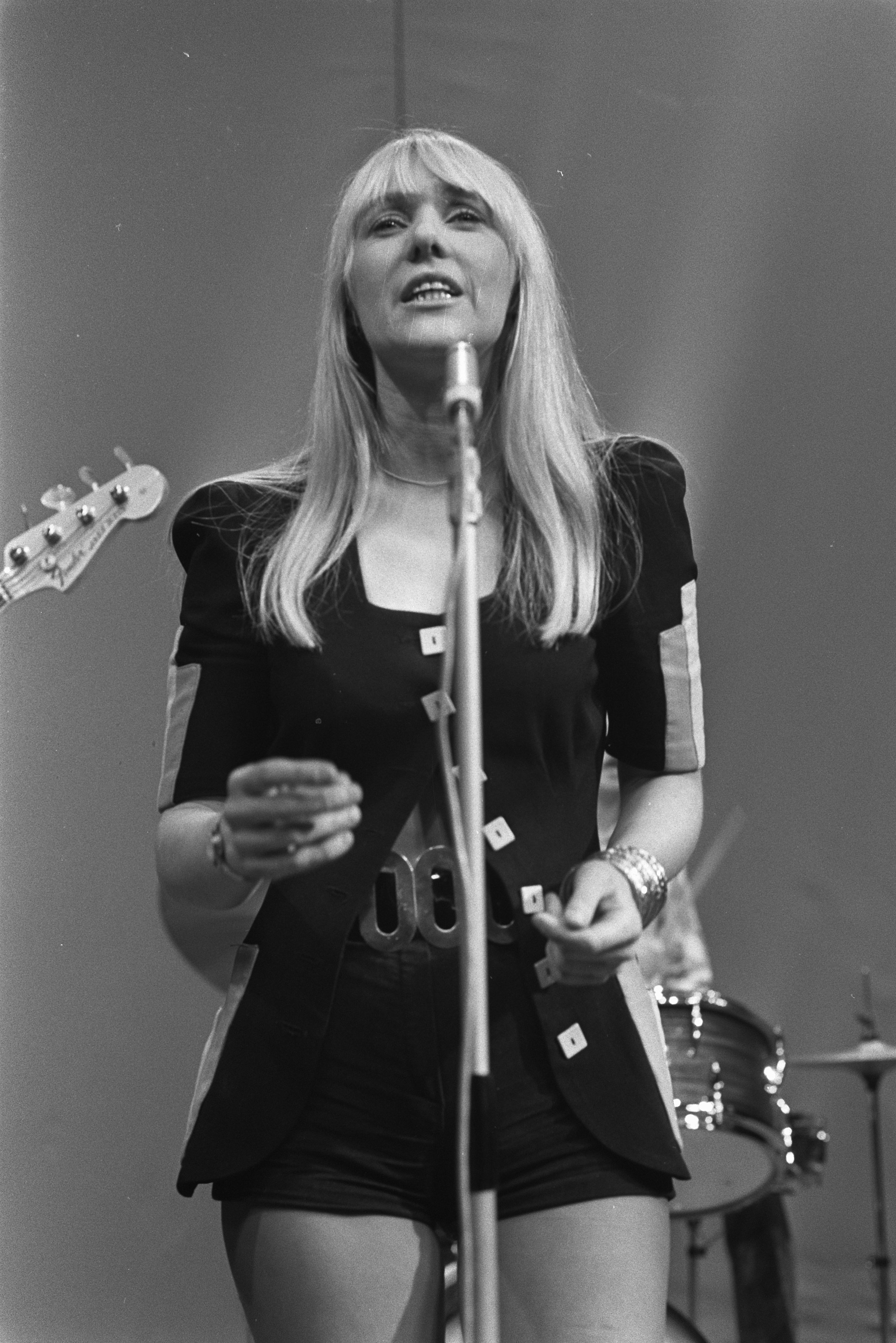
- Sally Carr in 1972

Background information
- Born: Sarah Cecilia Carr; 28 March 1945 (age 81)
- Origin: Muirhead, Scotland
- Genre: Pop
- Occupation: Singer
- Instruments: Vocals, percussion, tambourine
- Years active: 1970–1974; 1991–2012; 2016-present
- Labels: RCA, Ariola
- Member of: Middle of the Road

Sally Cecilia Carr (born 28 March 1945) is a Scottish singer, best known as the lead singer of the 1970s pop group Middle of the Road.

== Personal life ==
Sally Carr was born on 28 March 1945. She has four brothers. Her father was a miner. Her mother, Cecilia, was bedridden. When Carr was a child, the family used to sing around a piano; Carr never had any professional vocal training. As of 2010, Carr was still performing at oldies' concerts.

In 1978, Carr married journalist Chick Young and had a son, Keith, in 1980. They separated in 1984 but did not divorce and remained friends. On 18 January 2001, Keith was killed in a motorbike accident.

Carr suffered from a brain hemorrhage in 2012 and a stroke later, prompting her retirement from Middle of the Road. She later rejoined after her recovery in 2016.

== Music ==
Carr's first group was The Southerners. In 1971, the group Middle of the Road was formed, and Carr had success with songs such as "Soley Soley", Tweedle Dee, Tweedle Dum and "Chirpy Chirpy Cheep Cheep". Following the death of her mother Cecilia, Carr found it difficult to sing the lines "Where's your Mama gone?" and "Woke up this morning and my Mama was gone" from that song.
