= Colour Collection =

Colour Collection may refer to:

- Colour Collection (Frank Duval album), 2006
- Colour Collection (Grace Jones album), 2006
