= Samson and Delilah (Middle of the Road song) =

1972 single by Middle of the Road

- Cover of the single released in the Netherlands

Single by Middle of the Road

from the album Acceleration
- B-side: "Try a Little Understanding"
- Released: January 1972
- Recorded: October 1971
- Studio: RCA Studios, Rome
- Genre: Bubblegum pop
- Length: 3:04
- Label: RCA Victor
- Songwriters: Lally Stott; Giosy Capuano; Mario Capuano
- Producer: Giacomo Tosti

Middle of the Road singles chronology
"Sacramento (A Wonderful Town)" (1971)	"Samson and Delilah" (1972)	"Bottoms Up" (1972)

"Samson and Delilah" is a song by Scottish band Middle of the Road, released as a single in January 1972. It peaked at number 26 on the UK Singles Chart, becoming the band's final charting single there.

== Release ==
"Samson and Delilah" was first released in January 1972 in France with the B-side "Sacramento (A Wonderful Town)". Elsewhere, "Sacramento" had been released as the A-side with a different B-side. "Samson and Delilah" was then released in the Netherlands and Germany in March 1972 with the B-side "The Talk of All the U.S.A.". It was released in the UK on 30 June 1972 with the B-side "Try a Little Understanding".

== Track listings ==
7" (UK)

1. "Samson and Delilah" – 3:04
2. "Try a Little Understanding" – 3:22

7" (France)

1. "Samson and Delilah" – 2:48
2. "Sacramento (A Wonderful Town)" – 2:48

7" (Europe)

1. "Samson and Delilah" – 2:48
2. "The Talk of All the U.S.A." – 3:13

== Charts ==
=== Weekly charts ===
Chart (1972)	Peak position
Argentina (Escalera a la Fama)	2
Belgium (Ultratop 50 Flanders)	1
Belgium (Ultratop 50 Wallonia)	2
Denmark (IFPI)	5
Finland (Suomen virallinen lista)	15
France (IFOP)	2
Italy (Musica e dischi)	24
Malaysia (Rediffusion)	5
Mexico (Radio Mil)	5
Netherlands (Dutch Top 40)	1
Netherlands (Single Top 100)	1
Norway (VG-lista)	11
Rhodesia (Lyons Maid)	7
South Africa (Springbok Radio)	5
Switzerland (Schweizer Hitparade)	3
UK Singles (Official Charts)	26
West Germany (GfK)	2

=== Year-end charts ===
Chart (1972)	Position
Argentina (CAPIF)	20
Belgium (Ultratop Flanders)	17
France (IFOP)	32
Netherlands (Dutch Top 40)	22
Netherlands (Single Top 100)	19
West Germany (Official German Charts)	9

== Cover versions ==
- In February 1972, French singer Sheila released a French-language version, titled "Samson et Dalilah", which became a top-ten hit in France and peaked at number 12 in Wallonia.
- In March 1972, Dutch duo Big Secret released a version of the song as their debut single, which peaked at number 17 on the Dutch Single Top 100 and number 13 on the Dutch Top 40.
