= Die schönsten Melodien aus Derrick & Der Alte =

Compilation album by Frank Duval & Orchestra
- Released: 1979
- Genre: Pop music
- Length: 40:23
- Label: Teldec
- Producer: Frank Duval

Frank Duval & Orchestra chronology
Die schönsten Melodien aus Derrick & Der Alte (1979)	Angel of Mine (1981)

Die schönsten Melodien aus Derrick & Der Alte is a soundtrack compilation album by Frank Duval & Orchestra, celebrating two famous German TV series, Derrick and Der Alte. The debut release by Duval, it was released in 1979.

== Track listing ==
1. "Todesengel" – 4:30
2. "Me to You" – 3:08
3. "Ballade pour Adeline" – 2:35
4. "Sky Train" – 4:20
5. "Mandala" – 5:21
6. "Farewell" – 3:10
7. "Love" – 3:50
8. "Tyana" – 3:35
9. "Sorry to Leave You" – 2:02
10. "Tears" - 4:12
11. "Kalinas Melodie" - 3:25

== Personnel ==
- Martin Harrison - drums, percussion
- Günther Gebauer - bass guitar
- Billy Lang, Michael Goltz - guitar
- Mladen Franko - piano, Logan-strings: A.R.P.synthesizer
- Frank Duval - polymoog, minimoog
- Gudrun Haag - harp

== Credits ==
- Produced and Arranged by Frank Duval
- Engineered by Peter Floß
