= Chick Young =

Scottish football commentator

- Born: Charles Young; 4 May 1951 (age 75); Govan, Glasgow, Scotland
- Occupation: Journalist

Charles "Chick" Young (born 4 May 1951) is a professional association football pundit who regularly appears for BBC Scotland on Sportscene and Sportsound. He is known for his trademark laugh and speech patterns, which have made him a popular target for lampooning on the BBC Scotland sports comedy Only an Excuse?.

== Career ==
Young has become a prominent football commentator with the BBC. He started hosting episodes of Sportsound in October 2009, working two to three episodes a month. In addition, he regularly writes his own view on Scottish football matches and players in his online column with the BBC, titled, "Chick Young's View".

In 2008, he was injured in a game between MSPs in Glasgow. He was tackled and his ankle was badly hurt, forcing him to miss a charity golf event the following day.

In 2019, Young made a guest appearance as himself in the Scottish police comedy series Scot Squad.

== Personal life ==
Young was born in Govan, Glasgow. His father died at the age of 47 from a heart attack when Young was six years old. He attended Bellahouston Academy.

In 1978, Young married Sally Carr, lead singer of 1970s pop group Middle of the Road, and had a son, Keith, in 1980. They separated in 1984, but did not divorce, and remained friends. Their son Keith died at the age of 20 in 2001 in a road accident when his motorcycle was hit by a driver on the A8.
