= Yellow Boomerang =

1973 single by Middle of the Road

- Cover of the single released in the Netherlands

Single by Middle of the Road

from the album Drive On
- B-side: "Eve"
- Released: February 1973
- Genre: Bubblegum pop
- Length: 2:46
- Label: RCA Victor
- Songwriters: Mike Shepstone; Giosy Capuano; Mario Capuano
- Producers: Giacomo Tosti; Giosy Capuano; Mario Capuano

Middle of the Road singles chronology
"Bottoms Up" (1972)	"Yellow Boomerang" (1973)	"Union Silver" (1973)

"Yellow Boomerang" is a song by Scottish band Middle of the Road, released as a single in February 1973. It wasn't released in the UK, but was released in Europe where Middle of the Road had the most success. It was written by Italian brothers Giosy and Mario Capuano and Mike Shepstone (who had been the drummer for The Rokes).

== Track listing ==
7"

1. "Yellow Boomerang" – 2:46
2. "Eve" – 3:13

== Charts ==
=== Weekly charts ===
Chart (1973)	Peak position
Austria (Ö3 Austria Top 40)	14
Belgium (Ultratop 50 Flanders)	2
Belgium (Ultratop 50 Wallonia)	6
Denmark (IFPI)	2
Finland (Suomen virallinen lista)	11
Netherlands (Dutch Top 40)	2
Netherlands (Single Top 100)	1
New Zealand (Listener)	19
Norway (VG-lista)	8
Rhodesia (Lyons Maid)	9
South Africa (Springbok Radio)	13
Sweden (Kvällstoppen)	17
Switzerland (Schweizer Hitparade)	2
West Germany (GfK)	6

=== Year-end charts ===
Chart (1973)	Position
Belgium (Ultratop Flanders)	23
Netherlands (Dutch Top 40)	50
Netherlands (Single Top 100)	51
