= Lally Stott =

English singer-songwriter (1945–1977)

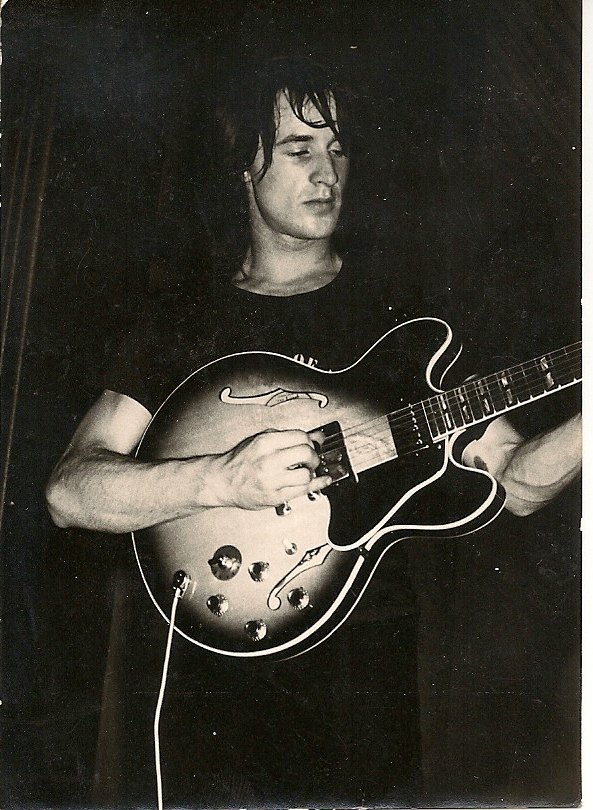
- Stott c. 1972

Background information
- Also known as: Lally Stott
- Born: Harold Stott Jr. 16 January 1945; Prescot, Lancashire, England, UK
- Died: 6 June 1977 (aged 32)
- Occupation: Singer-songwriter
- Instruments: Vocals, guitar
- Years active: 1960s–1970s

Harold "Lally" Stott Jr. (16 January 1945 – 6 June 1977) was an English singer-songwriter and musician who wrote the song "Chirpy Chirpy Cheep Cheep" which became a UK number one hit for the Scottish band Middle of the Road in 1971, charting at number 20 in the U.S. and number 41 in the UK the same year for Mac and Katie Kissoon.

== Early life ==
Harold Stott Jr. was born in Prescot, Lancashire, in 1945. He was named after his father. His father was Harold Stott Sr., and his mother was Lily Stott. Harold died on 8 April 1996, aged 86. His mother died five months later, on 28 September 1996. The name "Lally" was a nickname he was given as a child that stuck with him into adulthood.

== Career ==
=== 1960s ===
He was a member of many Merseybeat groups during the early sixties including The Vaqueros, Denny Seyton & The Sabres and Four Just Men who released two singles for Parlophone during 1964-65. This band would evolve into Wimple Winch, although Stott had quit the group by that time.

He spent several years in Italy, as vocalist and front-man of the 1960s Liverpool beat band The Motowns (originally called Lally Scott & The Black Jacks). Stott and the Motowns members appeared in the 1967 Italian film "Soldati e capelloni". Stott left the Motowns in 1969.

=== 1970s ===
He wrote the song "Chirpy Chirpy Cheep Cheep" and released his version in September 1970 on the Philips label. Scottish pop band Middle of the Road later released their version which went on to top the UK Singles Chart in 1971 for five weeks, also reaching number one in the Netherlands. Stott's own version of the song did not get into the UK Chart, but it was a hit in Italy, France and the Netherlands, and went to number one in Australia for one week and charted at number 92 on the U.S. Billboard Hot 100. The song has been covered in many languages, including Vietnamese, Korean, Estonian, Swedish, French, Finnish, Spanish, Dutch and German.

Stott released other minor hits, "Jakaranda" and "Love Is Free, Love Is Blind, Love Is Good". He also wrote "My Summer Song" which was recorded by Engelbert Humperdinck, Jerry Reed, and Jigsaw.. In 1970, In collaboration with Franco Micalizzi, he also composed the lyrics for the main title song of the film They Call Me Trinity, a song which was reprised forty years later in the soundtrack of Quentin Tarantino's Django Unchained. Stott co-wrote "Bottoms Up", "Samson and Delilah", "Sacramento", "Tweedle Dee, Tweedle Dum" and other songs for Middle of the Road, all reaching the top 10 in several European countries between 1971 and 1973.

Under his own name Stott released, with moderate success, "Good Wishes, Good Kisses" (the theme song of the Italian TV miniseries "Tenente Sheridan - La donna di picche") and "Sweet Meeny".

== Death ==
Stott was killed aged 32 in a traffic accident on 3 June 1977 while riding a small commuter bike close to his hometown of Prescot. His motorbike had just been stolen, and Stott had retrieved the vehicle from the police just a few days before his death. On Lally's next bike trip after getting his stolen motorbike back, a car pulled out in front of him, and he hit a telegraph pole. He suffered head and leg injuries and died three days later. He is buried in St. Ann's Churchyard, Rainhill.

== Discography ==
=== Albums ===
- Chirpy Chirpy, Cheep Cheep (1971)
