= Stephan Ebn =

German drummer and music producer

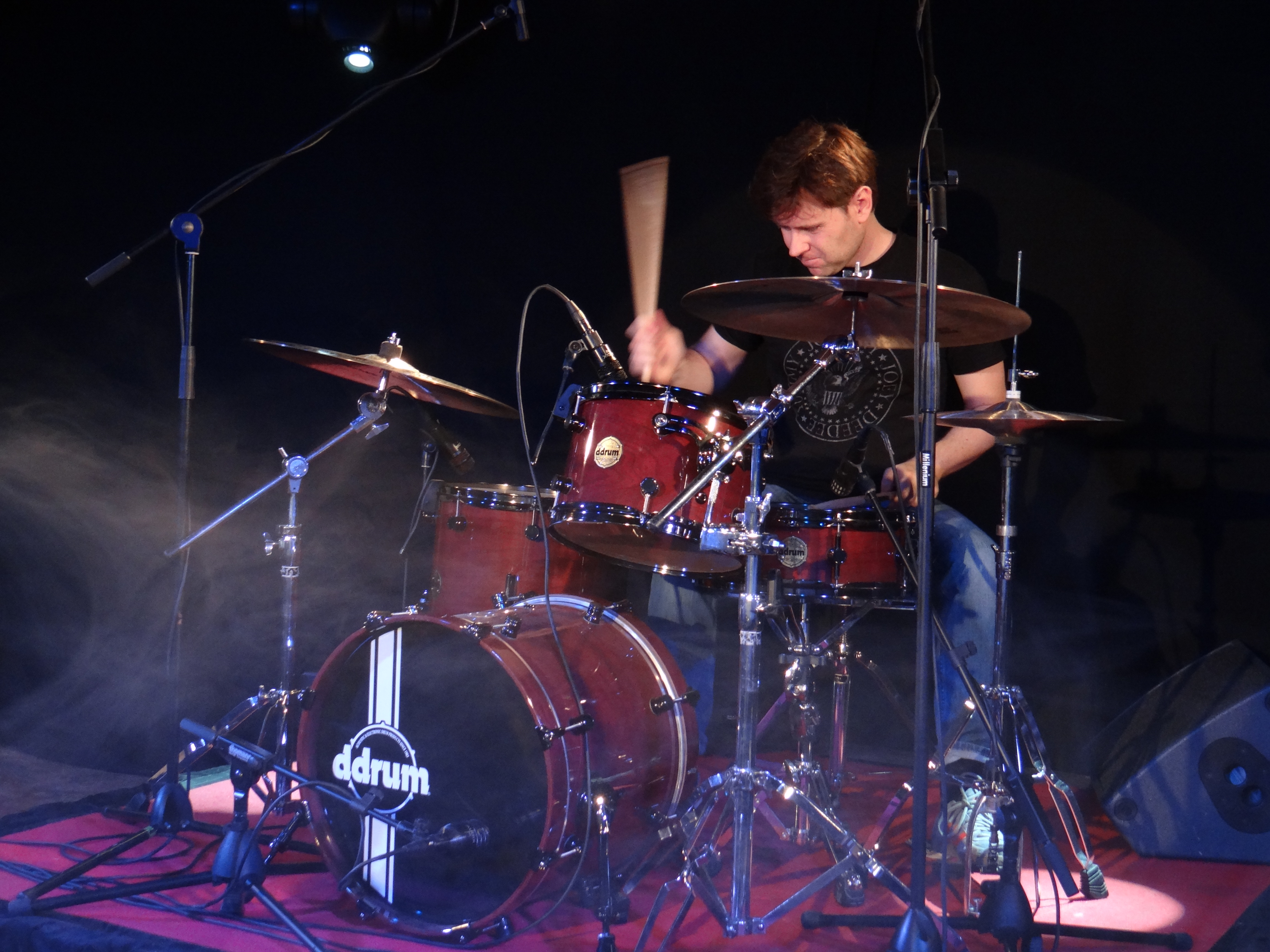
- Stephan Ebn (2013)

Background information
- Born: Stephan Ebn; February 13, 1978 (age 48); Kelheim, Germany
- Instrument: Drums
- Years active: 1997 - Present
- Member of: Middle of the Road
- Website: Official Website

Stephan Ebn (born 13 February 1978 in Kelheim, Lower Bavaria) is a German drummer and music producer. He studied jazz drums at the University of Music in Nuremberg from 1998 to 2003. Before and during this period, he had already worked on numerous projects in Europe and the United States both as a studio musician and live drummer. In the rock/pop field, he has collaborated with artists such as Gianna Nannini, Middle of the Road, Lynn Anderson, Helmut Zerlett, Kimberley Dahme, Jon Walmsley and Johan Eliasson among others. In the jazz field, he has also worked with Wolfgang Lackerschmid, Bill Molenhof, Claus Stötter, Jörg Widmoser, and many others. As a musician/producer, he has collaborated on numerous CD releases and has participated in countless international music festivals with a variety of artists. In 2014 he started working with the overtone singer Anna-Maria Hefele as a producer, composer and percussionist.

From 2006 to the present, Stephan is the drummer and programmer of the world-renowned Scottish band Middle of the Road, and he is currently touring with this band throughout Europe. In 2007, he started working with Gianna Nannini; first in studio and finally on stage. The Pia Come la Canto Io Tour was followed by over 60 concerts of the Giannabest Tour in 2008. During the Amiche per l'Abruzzo Concert on 21 June 2009 at the San Siro stadium in Milan, Stephan joined the stage with Gianna Nannini, Laura Pausini and others to benefit the victims of the earthquake in the Abruzzes. Since 2008, he joined Andreas Wiersich's Midnight Story Orchestra where he continues to work as a jazz drummer. Also in 2008, he started touring with the singer/songwriter Solly Aschkar, for whom Stephan has additionally produced the album Miles.

As a studio musician and producer, Stephan Ebn has worked in studios in Nashville, London, Glasgow and Milan, among other locations. He can also be heard on the soundtracks of numerous cinematic films such as The Vexxer, Jerry Cotton or more recently on the soundtrack of the new Bavarian cult film Trans Bavaria. Stephan is one of the most sought-after German tour and studio drummers.

== Bands ==
=== STARBUST ===
In 2012 Stephan Ebn formed a band with fellow studio musicians Helmut Zerlett, Giacomo Castellano and Hans Maahn. This group is a professional backing band featuring their own performances along with guest appearances by international artists.

=== Stephan Ebn Band ===
The Stephan Ebn Band is a modern jazz fusion band, led by drummer Stephan Ebn. The original lineup includes three musicians besides Stephan Ebn: Andreas Wiersich (guitars), Alex Bayer (bass) and Toni Hinterholzinger (keys).
