= Bottoms Up (Middle of the Road song) =

1972 single by Middle of the Road

- Cover of the single released in Itay

Single by Middle of the Road

from the album Drive On
- B-side: "See the Sky"
- Released: September 1972
- Recorded: 1972
- Genre: Bubblegum pop
- Length: 3:07
- Label: RCA Victor
- Songwriters: Lally Stott; Giosy Capuano; Mario Capuano
- Producers: Giacomo Tosti; Giosy Capuano; Mario Capuano

Middle of the Road singles chronology
"Samson and Delilah" (1972)	"Bottoms Up" (1972)	"Yellow Boomerang" (1973)

"Bottoms Up" is a song by Scottish band Middle of the Road, released as a single in September 1972. It failed to chart in the UK, but continued the band's success in Europe, becoming a top-ten hit in several countries. Unlike the version on many CD compilations, the single version has no bagpipes in the intro.

== Track listings ==
7"

1. "Bottoms Up" – 3:07
2. "See the Sky" – 3:24

== Charts ==
=== Weekly charts ===
Chart (1972)	Peak position
Argentina (Escalera a la Fama)	1
Australia (Kent Music Report)	71
Belgium (Ultratop 50 Flanders)	3
Belgium (Ultratop 50 Wallonia)	13
Denmark (IFPI)	3
Finland (Suomen virallinen lista)	18
Netherlands (Dutch Top 40)	5
Netherlands (Single Top 100)	5
Norway (VG-lista)	8
Rhodesia (Lyons Maid)	5
South Africa (Springbok Radio)	16
West Germany (GfK)	2

=== Year-end charts ===
Chart (1972)	Position
Belgium (Ultratop Flanders)	21
Netherlands (Dutch Top 40)	46
Netherlands (Single Top 100)	46

== Other versions ==
In 1972, Bárbara y Dick made the Argentine Top Ten with their version.
