= Tweedle Dee, Tweedle Dum (song) =

1971 single by Middle of the Road

- Cover of the single released in Italy

Single by Middle of the Road

from the album Chirpy Chirpy Cheep Cheep
- B-side: "Give It Time"
- Released: March 1971
- Recorded: 1971
- Studio: RCA Studios, Rome
- Genre: Bubblegum pop
- Length: 3:13
- Label: RCA Victor
- Songwriters: Lally Stott; Giosy Capuano; Mario Capuano
- Producer: Giacomo Tosti

Middle of the Road singles chronology
"Chirpy Chirpy Cheep Cheep" (1970)	"Tweedle Dee, Tweedle Dum" (1971)	"Soley Soley" (1971)

"Tweedle Dee, Tweedle Dum" is a song by Scottish band Middle of the Road, released as a single in March 1971. It peaked at number 2 on the UK Singles Chart and was a top-ten hit in numerous other countries. It has also sold over two million copies.

== Background and release ==
"Tweedle Dee, Tweedle Dum" was written by British singer-songwriter Lally Stott and Italian brothers Giosy and Mario Capuano. Stott had also written and first recorded the band's previous single "Chirpy Chirpy Cheep Cheep" and he would go on to write other hits for Middle of the Road with the Capuano brothers. The song is about a clan rivalry between the MacDougalls and the MacGregors.

It was first released as a single in Italy in March 1971. To promote it, the song was used in a short film by car manufacturer Fiat to promote the launch of the Fiat 127. The single's B-side "Give It Time" was also used in the film and the Middle of the Road members also featured in it. The single performed well in Italy, becoming a top-three hit, though this was not until October 1971. It was released in Europe in May and June 1971, in Australia on 26 August and a day later in the UK.

Middle of the Road also recorded and released a version in Spanish and the song was also later re-recorded and released as a single in Czechoslovakia in February 1972 for the annual song contest Bratislavská lýra.

== Track listings ==
7"

1. "Tweedle Dee, Tweedle Dum" – 3:13
2. "Give It Time" – 3:55

7" (Spain)

1. "Tweedle Dee Tweedle Dum" – 3:13
2. "Fate Strange Fate" – 3:09

7" (Spain)

1. "Los Reyes Magos (Tweedle Dee Tweedle Dum)" – 3:05
2. "Fate Strange Fate" – 3:09

7" (Czechoslovakia, 1972)

1. "Tweedle Dee, Tweedle Dum"
2. "The Talk of All the U.S.A."

== Charts ==
=== Weekly charts ===
Chart (1971)	Peak position
Argentina	9
Australia (Kent Music Report)	15
Belgium (Ultratop 50 Flanders)	7
Belgium (Ultratop 50 Wallonia)	16
Denmark (IFPI)	1
Finland (Suomen virallinen lista)	15
Ireland (IRMA)	2
Israel (Galei Tzahal)	3
Italy (Discografia Internazionale)	2
Italy (Musica e dischi)	3
Netherlands (Dutch Top 40)	7
Netherlands (Single Top 100)	5
New Zealand (Listener)	5
Norway (VG-lista)	6
Rhodesia (Lyons Maid)	3
Singapore (Rediffusion)	4
South Africa (Springbok Radio)	5
Spain (Promusicae)	6
Sweden (Kvällstoppen)	8
UK Singles (Official Charts)	2
West Germany (GfK)	15

=== Year-end charts ===
Chart (1971)	Position
Australia (Kent Music Report)	97
Belgium (Ultratop Flanders)	65
Italy	14
Netherlands (Dutch Top 40)	62
Netherlands (Single Top 100)	46
West Germany (Official German Charts)	38
UK Singles (OCC)	27

== Sheila version ==
"Les Rois mages"

Single by Sheila

from the album Love
- B-side: "Une femme"
- Released: 15 March 1971
- Recorded: 1971
- Studio: CBE, Paris
- Genre: French pop
- Length: 3:22
- Label: Carrere
- Songwriters: Lally Stott; Giosy Capuano; Mario Capuano; Jean Schmitt; Claude Carrère
- Producer: Claude Carrère

Sheila singles chronology
"Reviens, je t'aime" (1970)	"Les Rois mages" (1971)	"Blancs, jaunes, rouges, noirs" (1971)

French pop singer Sheila released a French-language version of the song titled "Les Rois mages", referring to the Wise Men. Released in March 1971, it topped the charts in France. Sheila also recorded a Spanish-language version, titled "Los Reyes magos", which was also released as a single, becoming a hit in several Spanish-speaking countries.

=== Track listings ===
7" (France)

1. "Les Rois mages" – 3:22
2. "Une femme" – 3:00

7" (Spain)

1. "Los Reyes magos" – 3:20
2. "Regresa, te quiero" – 2:55 [title in Spanish, but sung in French, original title "Reviens, je t'aime"]

7" (Argentina, Mexico, Venezuela)

1. "Los Reyes magos" – 3:20
2. "Una mujer" – 3:04 [title in Spanish, but sung in French, original title "Une femme"]

=== Charts ===
French version

Chart (1971)	Peak position
Belgium (Ultratop 50 Flanders)	2
Belgium (Ultratop 50 Wallonia)	1
France (CIDD)	1
Quebec (BAnQ)	1

Spanish version

Chart (1971)	Peak position
Argentina (Escalera a la Fama)	9
Mexico (Radio Mil)	2
Spain (Promusicae)	16
