= Colour Collection (Frank Duval album) =

Compilation album by Frank Duval
- Released: September 8, 2006
- Genre: Pop music
- Label: Brunswick/Universal
- Producer: Frank Duval

Frank Duval chronology
Spuren (2001)	Colour Collection (2006)

Colour Collection is a compilation album released in 2006 by German composer and singer Frank Duval.

== Track listing ==
1. "Angel Of Mine"
2. "Face To The Wind"
3. "Give Me Your Love"
4. "Ways"
5. "If I Could Fly Away"
6. "Living Like A Cry"
7. "Face To Face"
8. "Time For Lovers"
9. "Angel By My Side"
10. "Cry For Our World"
11. "Living My Way"
12. "It Was Love"
13. "Lonesome Ways"
14. "Lovers Will Survive"
15. "Todesengel"
