= Soley Soley =

1971 single by Middle of the Road

- Cover of the single released in West Germany

Single by Middle of the Road

from the album Acceleration
- B-side: "To Remind Me"
- Released: August 1971
- Recorded: 1971
- Studio: RCA Studios, Madrid
- Genre: Bubblegum pop
- Length: 3:02
- Label: RCA Victor
- Songwriter: Fernando Arbex
- Producer: Giacomo Tosti

Middle of the Road singles chronology
"Tweedle Dee, Tweedle Dum" (1970)	"Soley Soley" (1971)	"Sacramento (A Wonderful Town)" (1971)

"Soley Soley" is a song by Scottish band Middle of the Road, released as a single in August 1971. It peaked at number 5 in the UK Singles Chart and also topped the charts in some countries.

== Release ==
"Soley Soley" was written by Spanish musician Fernando Arbex and a demo recording was made by Middle of the Road whilst they were in Francoist Spain. This was then forwarded to RCA in Rome to be finalised. It was first released in the Netherlands in August 1971 and was released in the UK on 26 November 1971. The B-side, "To Remind Me", was written by Lally Stott, brothers Giosy and Mario Capuano, and Middle of the Road lead singer Sally Carr.

== Track listings ==
7"

1. "Soley Soley" – 3:02
2. "To Remind Me" – 3:28

== Charts ==
=== Weekly charts ===
Chart (1971–72)	Peak position
Argentina (Escalera a la fama)	3
Australia (Kent Music Report)	23
Austria	2
Belgium (Ultratop 50 Flanders)	1
Belgium (Ultratop 50 Wallonia)	1
Brazil (IBOPE)	1
Denmark (IFPI)	2
Finland (Suomen virallinen lista)	3
France (IFOP)	19
Ireland (IRMA)	12
Israel (Galei Tzahal)	1
Italy (Musica e dischi)	17
Netherlands (Dutch Top 40)	1
Netherlands (Single Top 100)	1
New Zealand (Listener)	6
Norway (VG-lista)	1
Rhodesia (Lyons Maid)	1
Singapore (Rediffusion)	2
South Africa (Springbok Radio)	1
Spain (Promusicae)	6
Sweden (Kvällstoppen)	1
Switzerland (Schweizer Hitparade)	1
UK Singles (Official Charts)	5
West Germany (GfK)	2
Yugoslavia	9

=== Year-end charts ===
Chart (1971)	Position
Belgium (Ultratop Flanders)	3
Netherlands (Dutch Top 40)	5
Netherlands (Single Top 100)	2

Chart (1972)	Position
Argentina (CAPIF)	37
Denmark (IFPI)	14
Italy	82
South Africa (Springbok Radio)	2
West Germany (Official German Charts)	26
