= Bárbara y Dick =

Argentine pop music duo

- Also known as: Barbara and Dick, Barbara & Dick
- Genres: Pop music
- Years active: 1960s, 1970s - 1990s
- Labels: Vik Records, International, RCA Victor, Lluvia De Estrellas, Discos Hit, Coprodisa, CBS, Famoso
- Past members: Bárbara Bourse, Fernando Sustaita

Bárbara y Dick aka Barbara & Dick were a male and female vocal duo who had a number of hits in Argentina during the 1960s and 1970s.

== Background ==
A Vocal duo from Buenos Aires, they were active during the 1960s and then the 1970s to the 1990s. They were Bárbara Bourse and Fernando "Dick" Sustaita. An example of them having consecutive charts hits was on the week ending May 20, 1967 where they had three songs in the Argentina Top Ten. They had "Sacale Las Balas A Tu Fusil" at no. 4, "Sunny" at no. 7, and "Little Man" at no. 10.

== Career ==
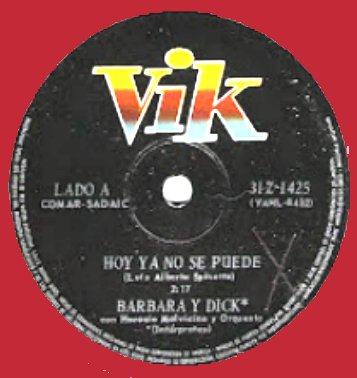
Barbra Y Dick discography cover

In 1966, they covered the Beatles' song "Michelle". Backed with "Guantanamera", it was released on RCA Victor 31Z-0843. On the week ending October 22, 1966, their version of "Guantanamera" was at no. 1 in Argentina. And "Michelle" had just made its debut at no. 9 in the same chart.

On the week ending March 23, 1968, their record "Judy Disfrazada" made its debut at no. 8 in the Buenos Aires Top Ten. The Following week they were at no. 7 while Anthony Swete had made his debut at no. 4 with his version in the same chart. From April 13 to May 4, there was no Buenos Aires Top Ten category in Billboard Hits of the World section so further progress isn't shown. The Argentina section was now included in the May 11 issue. There was no charting of their single in the top ten range.

In 1972, they were in the Argentine Top Ten with "Bottoms Up".

== Later years ==
As a solo artist, Bárbara recorded the album Como una ola which was released on Microfon PRK 1209 in 1985.

Fernando "Dick" Sustaita died in 2016.
