= Frank Duval =

German composer & conductor

- Genres: Pop
- Occupations: Conductor; composer; singer
- Years active: 1977–2001
- Labels: Brunswick/Universal. (2001–); Eastwest (1989–95); Teldec (1979–89)
- Website: frankduval.com

Frank Duval is a German composer, conductor, record producer, songwriter, and singer.

== Early life and education ==
Born into a family of artists, Frank Duval studied as an actor and dancer, and also sang with his sister, Maria.

== Career ==
By the 1960s, Duval was composing music, both orchestral and pop, and his first soundtrack, for an episode of the German serial Tatort, was broadcast in 1977. The song "Todesengel" from his 1979 debut album, Die schönsten Melodien aus Derrick und Der Alte, became a moderate hit, and was a number one in Switzerland in 1979.

During the 1980s, Duval released several soundtracks, as well as solo albums, with lyrics occasionally co-written with his wife Kalina Maloyer. He had several singles enter the German charts, including "Angel of Mine" (Number One in 1981), "Ways" (1983), "Lovers Will Survive" (1986), and "When You Were Mine" (1987).

Duval wrote songs for Ivan Rebroff, Alexandra, Karin Huebner, Margot Werner, Klaus Löwitsch, and Maria Schell.

== Discography ==
=== As Frank Duval ===
==== Studio albums ====
Year	Title	Peak chart positions				
Year	Title	AUT	GER	NL	NOR	SWI
1979	Die schönsten Melodien aus Derrick und Der Alte	—	—	—	33	—
1981	Angel of Mine	1	22	11	1	—
1982	Face to Face	—	7	—	—	—
1983	If I Could Fly Away	6	3	—	—	20
1984	Living Like a Cry	—	31	—	9	27
1985	Time for Lovers	19	28	39	—	15
1986	Bitte laßt die Blumen leben	—	—	—	—	—
1987	When You Were Mine	—	—	—	—	—
1989	Touch My Soul	—	—	—	—	—
1991	Solitude	—	—	—	—	—
1994	Vision	—	—	—	—	—

==== Compilation albums ====
- Die grössten Erfolge (1985)
- Greatest Hits (1986)
- Frank Duval (1988)
- Seine grössten Erfolge (1989)
- Derrick Forever (2000)
- Angel of Mine (2001)
- Spuren (2001) (3 CD-box)
- Colour Collection (2006)

==== Singles ====
Year	Single	Peak chart positions					
Year	Single	AUT	BE (FLA)	GER	NL	NOR	SWI
1977	"Love"	—	—	—	—	—	—
1977	"Hey Girl"	—	—	—	—	—	—
1978	"Blizz"	—	—	—	—	—	—
1979	"Kalina's Melodie"	—	—	—	—	—	—
1979	"Todesengel"	6	—	20	—	—	1
1980	"Schwarzer Walzer"	—	—	—	—	—	—
1980	"Mystic Love"	—	—	—	—	—	—
1980	"Angel of Mine"	1	2	1	1	7	1
1981	"Cry (For Our World)"	11	—	12	—	—	4
1981	"Autumn Dreams"	—	—	—	—	—	—
1982	"Face to Face"	—	—	13	—	—	4
1983	"If I Could Fly Away"	—	—	69	—	—	—
1983	"Give Me Your Love"	1	—	2	—	—	5
1983	"Ways"	—	—	27	—	—	18
1984	"Something Is Crying"	—	—	—	—	—	—
1984	"Living Like a Cry"	—	—	40	—	—	—
1984	"Alaya"	—	—	—	—	—	—
1984	"What a Day" (featuring Peter Bischof)	—	—	68	—	—	—
1985	"It Was Love" (with Kalina Maloyer)	—	—	—	18	—	—
1985	"Angel By My Side" (with Kalina Maloyer)	19	—	—	—	—	—
1985	"Time for Lovers" (with Kalina Maloyer)	30	—	27	—	—	—
1986	"Liebe und Tod" (with Kalina Maloyer)	19	—	25	—	—	7
1986	"Lovers Will Survive" (with Kalina Maloyer)	—	—	—	—	—	—
1987	"Face to the Wind"	—	—	—	—	—	—
1987	"Why"	—	—	—	—	—	—
1987	"Fight in Myself"	—	—	—	—	—	—
1988	"Love Me, Love"	—	—	—	—	—	—
1988	"Children of Our Time"	—	—	—	—	—	—
1989	"Touch My Soul"	—	—	—	—	—	—
1990	"Living My Way"	—	—	—	—	—	—
