= Sacramento (A Wonderful Town) =

1971 single by Middle of the Road

- Cover of the single released in the Netherlands

Single by Middle of the Road

from the album Acceleration
- B-side: "Love Sweet Love"
- Released: November 1971
- Recorded: October 1971
- Studio: RCA Studios, Rome
- Genre: Bubblegum pop
- Length: 2:48
- Label: RCA Victor
- Songwriters: Lally Stott; Rubirosa; Giosy Capuano; Mario Capuano
- Producer: Giacomo Tosti

Middle of the Road singles chronology
"Soley Soley" (1971)	"Sacramento (A Wonderful Town)" (1971)	"Samson and Delilah" (1972)

"Sacramento (A Wonderful Town)" is a song by Scottish band Middle of the Road, released as a single in November 1971. It peaked at number 23 on the UK Singles Chart, showing the band's decline in popularity in the UK. However, elsewhere, the band continued their success in Europe, topping the charts in several countries.

== Release ==
"Sacramento (A Wonderful Town)" was first released in November 1971 in Italy, before being released in the Netherlands and Germany the following month. It was released in the UK on 17 March 1972. In most countries, it was released with the B-side "Love Sweet Love", which was written by Italian brothers Giosy and Mario Capuano, as well as Middle of the Road guitarist Ian McCredie. However, in a few countries, Spain, Peru and New Zealand, "Sacramento" was released with the B-side "Samson and Delilah", which was later released as the follow-up single.

== Track listings ==
7"

1. "Sacramento (A Wonderful Town)" – 2:48
2. "Love Sweet Love" – 3:34

7"

1. "Sacramento (A Wonderful Town)" – 2:48
2. "Samson and Delilah" – 3:02

== Charts ==
=== Weekly charts ===
Chart (1972)	Peak position
Argentina (Escalera a la fama)	3
Australia (Kent Music Report)	79
Australia	5
Austria (Hitradio Ö3)	1
Belgium (Ultratop 50 Flanders)	1
Belgium (Ultratop 50 Wallonia)	1
Denmark (IFPI)	2
Finland (Suomen virallinen lista)	6
Hong Kong (Radio Hong Kong)	8
Israel (Galei Tzahal)	9
Italy (Musica e dischi)	19
Malaysia (Rediffusion)	5
Netherlands (Dutch Top 40)	1
Netherlands (Single Top 100)	1
Norway (VG-lista)	1
Rhodesia (Lyons Maid)	2
South Africa (Springbok Radio)	3
Spain (Promusicae)	17
Sweden (Kvällstoppen)	5
Switzerland (Schweizer Hitparade)	1
UK Singles (Official Charts)	23
West Germany (GfK)	1

=== Year-end charts ===
Chart (1972)	Position
Argentina (CAPIF)	43
Belgium (Ultratop 50 Flanders)	2
Netherlands (Dutch Top 40)	2
Netherlands (Single Top 100)	1
Switzerland (Schweizer Hitparade)	2
West Germany (Official German Charts)	3
