= Chirpy Chirpy Cheep Cheep =

1970 single by Lally Stott

"Chirpy Chirpy, Cheep Cheep"
- Side A of the 1971 Australian single

Single by Lally Stott

from the album Chirpy Chirpy, Cheep Cheep
- B-side: "Henry James"
- Released: September 1970
- Recorded: 1970
- Genre: Bubblegum
- Length: 2:53
- Label: Philips
- Songwriters: Giuseppe Cassia; Harold Stott
- Producer: Lally Stott

Lally Stott singles chronology
"Signora Jones" (1969)	"Chirpy Chirpy, Cheep Cheep" (1970)	"Jakaranda" (1971)

Music video
- "Chirpy Chirpy Cheep Cheep" (TopPop, 1971) on YouTube

"Chirpy Chirpy Cheep Cheep"
- Side A variant of the 1971 UK single

Single by Middle of the Road

from the album Chirpy Chirpy Cheep Cheep
- B-side: "Rainin' 'n Painin'"
- Released: October 1970
- Recorded: 1970
- Studio: RCA, Rome
- Genre: Pop
- Length: 2:56
- Label: RCA Victor
- Songwriter: Lally Stott
- Producers: Giacomo Tosti; Italo Greco

Middle of the Road singles chronology
"Chirpy Chirpy Cheep Cheep" (1970)	"Tweedle Dee, Tweedle Dum" (1971)

Music video
- "Chirpy Chirpy Cheep Cheep" on YouTube

"Chirpy Chirpy, Cheep Cheep"
- Side A variant of the US single

Single by Mac and Katie Kissoon

from the album The Beginning
- B-side: "Walking Around"
- Released: 28 May 1971
- Genre: Bubblegum pop; soul
- Length: 2:50
- Label: Young Blood; ABC
- Songwriter: Lally Stott
- Producer: Miki Dallon

Mac and Katie Kissoon singles chronology
"Acts of Violence" (1970)	"Chirpy Chirpy, Cheep Cheep" (1971)	"Pigeon" (1971)

Audio
- "Chirpy Chirpy Cheep Cheep" on YouTube

"Chirpy Chirpy, Cheep Cheep" is a song recorded in 1970 by its composer Lally Stott, and made popular in 1971 by Scottish band Middle of the Road, for whom it was a UK No. 1 chart hit. That version is one of fewer than fifty singles to have sold more than ten million physical copies worldwide.

== History ==
The original recording of the song by Lally Stott was first released in September 1970 in Italy, where he had been living for several years. It was a hit, entering the Top 20 at the beginning of October. The record company, Philips, was reluctant to release it overseas, and offered it to two other groups: Scottish folk-pop group Middle of the Road, who were working in Italy at the time, and the Trinidadian brother-and-sister duo Mac and Katie Kissoon. Philips eventually released Stott's version elsewhere and it topped the charts in Australia and Rhodesia, as well as hitting the Top Ten in South Africa. It was not a hit in the US, though it peaked at number 92 on the Billboard Hot 100, something that Middle of the Road never achieved.

Middle of the Road released their version in October 1970 in Italy, though it failed to chart there. It was released in the UK on 15 January 1971 and initially became a hit in continental Europe only, before later growing in popularity in the UK. It entered the UK Singles Chart in the final week of May and reportedly got a boost from DJ Tony Blackburn, who favoured this version over the one by Mac and Katie Kissoon (which had recently been released), and topped the charts three weeks later for five weeks. Mac and Katie Kissoon's version, released in May 1971, had the most success in North America, peaking at number 20 on the Billboard Hot 100 and number 10 on the Canadian RPM chart.

At the time, the song was dismissed by critics as bubblegum, a view initially held by band leader Ken Andrew: "We were as disgusted with the thought of recording it as most people were at the thought of buying it. But at the end of the day, we liked it."

In 2006 "Chirpy Chirpy Cheep Cheep" topped a list of unintentionally creepy songs in The Observer. Despite its popular appeal and popular chorus, the song has a theme of child abandonment.

== In popular culture ==
The song was included in the "party scene" of the 1971 Israeli comedy film Katz and Carrasso directed by Menahem Golan.

== Charts ==
=== Lally Stott version ===
Weekly charts

Chart (1970–1971)	Peak position
Australia (Kent Music Report)	1
Italy (Discografia Internazionale)	11
Italy (Musica e dischi)	11
Netherlands (Dutch Top 40)	8
Netherlands (Single Top 100)	15
New Zealand (Listener)	9
Rhodesia (Lyons Maid)	1
South Africa (Springbok)	9
US Billboard Hot 100	92

Year-end charts

Chart (1970)	Position
Italy	58

Chart (1971)	Position
Australia (Kent Music Report)	21
Netherlands (Dutch Top 40)	83

=== Middle of the Road version ===
Weekly charts

Chart (1971)	Peak position
Australia (Kent Music Report)	2
Austria (Ö3 Austria Top 40)	2
Belgium (Ultratop 50 Flanders)	1
Belgium (Ultratop 50 Wallonia)	1
Denmark (IFPI)	1
Finland (Suomen virallinen lista)	3
Ireland (IRMA)	1
Israel (Galei Tzahal)	1
Netherlands (Dutch Top 40)	2
Netherlands (Single Top 100)	2
Malaysia (Rediffusion)	2
Mexico (Radio Mil)	3
New Zealand (Listener)	8
Norway (VG-lista)	1
Singapore (Rediffusion)	2
Spain (Promusicae)	1
Sweden (Kvällstoppen)	1
Switzerland (Schweizer Hitparade)	1
UK Singles (Official Charts)	1
West Germany (GfK)	2

Year-end charts

Chart (1971)	Position
Australia (Kent Music Report)	28
Belgium (Ultratop Flanders)	9
Denmark (IFPI)	1
Netherlands (Dutch Top 40)	29
Netherlands (Single Top 100)	30
Spain (Promusicae)	5
Switzerland (Schweizer Hitparade)	1
UK Singles (OCC)	3
West Germany (Official German Charts)	2

=== Sales ===
Sales for Chirpy Chirpy Cheep Cheep
Region	Sales
Belgium	178,000
Germany	1,000,000
United Kingdom	500,000
Europe	4,000,000
Worldwide	10,000,000

=== Mac and Katie Kissoon version ===
Weekly charts

Chart (1971)	Peak position
Canada Top Singles (RPM)	10
Canada Adult Contemporary (RPM)	11
UK Singles (Official Charts)	41
US Billboard Hot 100	20
US Adult Contemporary (Billboard)	10
US Cash Box Top 100	18
