= Moviestar (Harpo song) =

1975 single by Harpo

Single by Harpo

from the album Moviestar
- B-side: "Teddy Love" (Sweden); "I Don't Know Why" (Worldwide)
- Released: 18 July 1975
- Recorded: 27 February 1975
- Studio: EMI (Skärmarbrink, Sweden)
- Genre: Pop; schlager
- Label: EMI (Europe); DJM (UK)
- Songwriter: Harpo
- Producer: Bengt Palmers

Harpo singles chronology
| "Motorcycle Mama" (1975) | "Moviestar" (1975) | "Horoscope" (1976) |

Music video
- "Moviestar" (audio) on YouTube

"Moviestar" (also released as "Movie Star") is a song written and recorded by Swedish singer-songwriter Harpo. Following two hit singles on Tio i Topp, Harpo wrote the song while sitting by his window, dedicating it to a friend of his that had aspirations of becoming an actor. "Moviestar" tells the story of an individual who believes they are an A-list actor in the league of Steve McQueen and James Dean, when instead it is revealed that they have only acted in a television advertisement. It makes multiple references to popular culture, including movie producer Ingmar Bergman.

When presented with the song, producer Bengt Palmers rejected it as he felt he could not properly produce the record. After Sveriges Television started shooting a documentary about Harpo, the song was resurrected and recorded in front of television cameras in February 1975. Anni-Frid Lyngstad from ABBA, an acquaintance of Harpo, sings backing vocals on the recording.

The song was first released as a single on 18 July 1975 in the United Kingdom, backed by "Teddy Love". It initially became a hit in continental Europe, charting in the Netherlands during August of that year. It made its way across Europe to Germany, and eventually Scandinavia, reaching number one in all territories before also landing on the UK Singles Chart the following year. The single was well-received upon release, with many critics praising the production of Palmers. It has sold over one million copies worldwide and has become Harpo's signature song.

== Background ==
Harpo had a background in theatre before music; during his late teens and early 20s, he taught at the Calle Flygare Teaterskola in Norrmalm, Stockholm for several years. There he met several people that would eventually become friends or acquaintances of his. While touring with a theatrical troupe, he eventually began writing songs which caught the attention of several of these friends. They encouraged Harpo to secure a deal with a record label which he did by "picking up a phone book and calling recording studios", which would eventually attract the attention of Stig "Stikkan" Andersson at Polar Music in 1972. Andersson managed pop group ABBA and thus the band and Harpo became friends. Harpo started composing an album together with their keyboardist Benny Andersson, but due to personal clashes the duo abandoned the project after which Harpo was released from his contract with Polar.

"The song ["Moviestar"] actually came quite naturally for me. I started humming the melody and it went on from there. Everything just came into place and that's what I've always enjoyed about the song."

— Harpo, Hitlåtens historia, Sveriges Television

Instead, he signed with EMI Records and started a creative partnership with Bengt Palmers, who was behind several successful recordings in Sweden during the late 1960s and early 1970s. In 1973, he released his debut single "Honolulu", co-written by the duo. It became a hit, reaching number two on Tio i Topp during that year. The following year, his single "Sayonara" managed to reach number one for five weeks on Tio i Topp. With these singles, he became an established singer-songwriter in Sweden. However, with the exception of "Sayonara" becoming a hit in Norway, he saw virtually no success abroad.

Harpo wrote "Moviestar" while sitting in his window during the winter of 1974–75 and dedicated the song to a friend of his that he had met in drama school. This friend had ambitions of becoming an actor which Harpo found amusing. His friend has never been publicly named, with Harpo wanting him to remain anonymous. After hearing the song, some acquaintances of Harpo pushed him to force his record label to record the song. According to an interview with Sveriges Radio in 2017, Harpo claimed that he wrote "Moviestar" while hitchhiking across Europe at the age of 17, while being fascinated over the film industry. He stated that he felt most actors were better off-screen than on-screen which Harpo would state influenced the lyrics.

== Composition and recording ==
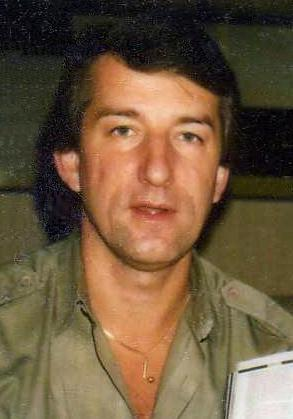
Bengt Palmers produced and wrote arrangements for the song.

Lyrically, the song follows an aspiring actor who has dreams of becoming a respectable and famous actor. The lyrics, written from a third-person perspective, reveals that this actor has only been featured in television commercials that do not match his aspirations. Themes of arrogance are also present; Harpo alludes to James Bond, Steve McQueen and James Dean as a comparison to this actor. Referencing his home country, Harpo featured a line about this actor traveling to Sweden to "meet Ingmar Bergman" who "wasn't there or he just didn't care." According to Sveriges Radio, this brought some depth to the song which otherwise would've been "a tragic song about a failed actor".

Musically, the song is rather upbeat with a significant influence from both disco and Schlager music. It has a standard time signature of 4/4 and the majority of the composition is set in the key of D major but features significant modulations, that come in after each choruses. In total, three modulations can be heard throughout the song. The song incorporates unconventional instrumentation through a triangle which prevails particularly during the intro and choruses. The song features a string arrangement written by producer Bengt Palmers, which in the eyes of Kjell Andersson "increased the popularity of the song drastically". They take up a significant portion of the song. Unusually, Harpo would not record a demo for the song.

After taking the song to his producer Bengt Palmers, it was immediately rejected by him because "Palmers didn't know what to do with the song". The song was almost completely discarded had it not been for Sveriges Television wanting to shoot a documentary about how songs are produced in the studio. Since Harpo already had several hits, they wanted to use him for the recording. Having no other material, Harpo once again presented Palmers with the track, who this time accepted. Retrospectively, Harpo has stated that "it was Sveriges Television that made 'Moviestar' a hit, had it not been for them I would've most likely never recorded the song to begin with".

"Moviestar" therefore marks an early example of when a recording session was entirely documented on film. The recording session for the song was held on 27 February 1975 at the EMI Studio in Skärmarbrink, a suburb of Stockholm. The backing vocals on the song were supplied by Anni-Frid Lyngstad of ABBA, who had several ties and connections to Palmers and Polar Music. Contrary to popular belief, Agnetha Fältskog was not present at the session; the second female backing vocalist is Lena Ericsson who also had ties to ABBA. Bengt Palmers did not think that the arrangement of the song was quite right by the end of the recording session so without the knowledge of Harpo, the following morning he re-recorded most of the musical backing with the help of several studio musicians. A Swedish-language vocal track was also recorded during this session.

== Release and commercial performance ==
The release for the single became particularly troubling in the UK, as the English division of EMI Records refused to release it on their label. Rumours alleged that EMI "refused to host Swedish artists" in order not to create competition with ABBA, who were big in the UK. Eventually, EMI Sweden managed to secure a release for the single through a smaller record label, DJM Records, on 18 July 1975. The UK release was issued as the grammatically correct "Movie Star", while most other releases retain the title "Moviestar". It was released across Europe during the same time, this time through EMI. EMI Records did not financially promote the single; Harpo allegedly had to take the train to radio stations across Europe by his own. The different releases also had differing B-sides; in Sweden, France and the UK the single was backed by "Teddy Love", which was co-written by Palmers and Harpo. In the rest of continental Europe, "Moviestar" was backed by "I Don't Know Why", a song taken from his debut album Leo the Leopard the previous year.

A press-party for "Moviestar" after it sold gold. Harpo at the bottom holding the dog Nipper.

The single became a surprise hit for Harpo, who did not expect it to become a charting single in Europe. According to Roger Lindhorst, television appearances and word-of-mouth were the contributing factors for the single becoming a hit. The first country it charted in was the Netherlands on the Dutch Top 40; it entered on 18 August 1975. The following week it would enter the other Dutch chart, Single Top 100. The single would reach number two and three respectively on those charts; "Sailing" by Rod Stewart kept it from the top on the former. "Moviestar" had significant appeal in the German-speaking world, reaching number one in Germany, Austria and Switzerland. In Switzerland it sat at number one for five consecutive weeks while it was at number one for four weeks in Germany.

"Moviestar" would eventually also become a hit in Oceania, reaching the top-ten in both Australia and New Zealand. The appeal for the single there is largely attributed to ABBA, who created an appeal for Swedish artists; this combined with the fact that Lyngstad sang backing vocals on the track were deemed enough to guarantee a charting hit. It reached number one in all three Scandinavian countries while also reaching number ten in Finland. To broaden his commercial appeal in Sweden, the Swedish-language version of "Moviestar" was issued as a single and eventually also reached number one on Svensktoppen in 1976. Seeing the commercial success it had in continental Europe, the UK branch of EMI attempted to re-release the single on their label. However, this move was blocked by DJM who threatened a lawsuit as it would breach contract. They eventually relented which led to "Movie Star" becoming a chart hit in the UK, reaching number 24 on the UK Singles Chart in May 1976.

To capitalize on the single reaching number one in West Germany, EMI quickly put together unreleased recordings done by Harpo and released them as Moviestar, which includes both the title track and the B-side "Teddy Love". In the Netherlands and Belgium, it was released as I Wrote a Love Song. In Sweden, the album reached number two, held off the top spot by Nya Perspektiv by Ola Magnell and I Love to Love by Tina Charles. "Moviestar" has since appeared on numerous compilation albums including EMI Europe Presents: Our Message Is Music in 1977.

== Critical reception and legacy ==
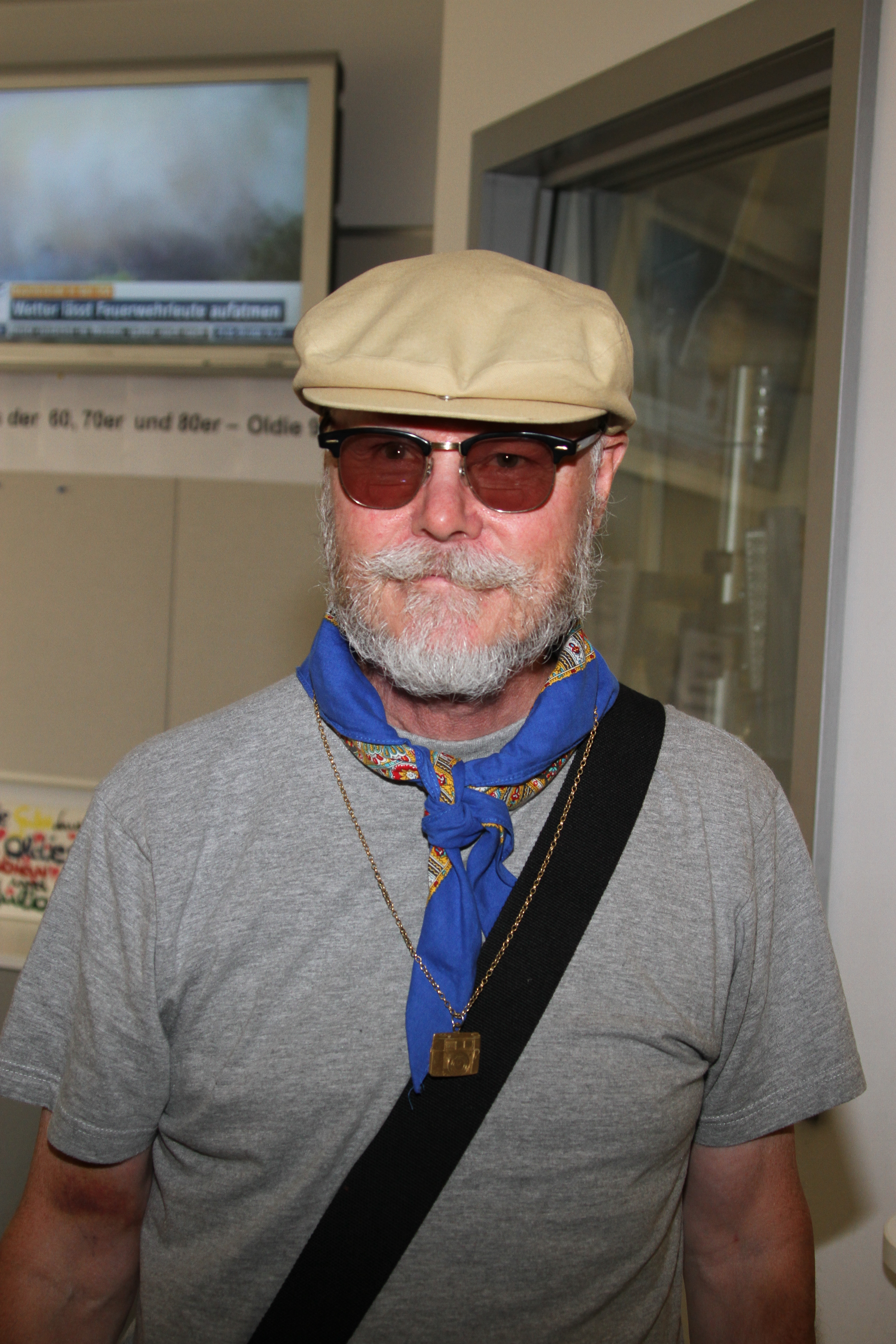
Harpo in 2012.

Upon release in Sweden, the single was reviewed by Expressen, who wrote that "Moviestar is a pretty song" that has several layers of depth to it, with "marvellous production" by Bengt Palmers. They note Harpo's vocal performance, which they claim is carried by the backing accompaniment and give praise to the bass guitarist especially. Aftonbladet wrote that "Moviestar certainly deserved the chart success it got across Europe" due to the catchy chorus, "funny and intriguing lyrics" and an excellent production. They praise the modulations found in the sound but compares the song to that of ABBA. In Svenska Dagbladet, the single is described as "an excellent addition to Sweden as a musical country", writing that it has potential to top the Billboard Hot 100 like Blue Swede's "Hooked on a Feeling" did the year before. They praise the production, noting that Palmers "adds a personal touch to all songs and records he work on." They end the review by stating that it most likely will reach number one in Sweden.

In Record Mirror, Jan Iles called the song "fresh" and "commercial", writing that it is a "glam, G-plan, streamlined rock product". Harpo himself has held varying opinions about the song. In an interview with Sveriges Radio, he stated "I like the song, there is something organic with the sound, the melody and the title actually. It's the completeness which makes the song." In an interview for Sveriges Television however, he stated that the song was mostly a "money printer through royalties for my true hobby", horse breeding. He stated that he thought it was "abstract but fun" that "Moviestar" was being played a long time after it was a hit. Ironically, however, Harpo has stated that he was not the biggest fan of Schlager music.

Harpo has sold 20 million records, most of which are sales from "Moviestar". In 1995, a study revealed that "Moviestar" was the second-biggest selling single in Swedish history between 1975 and 1995, behind only "Shenandoah" by Jan Lindblad. In Norway, the song is the 30th best selling single in history, while it is the 73rd most successful single in Sweden. It is therefore cited as one of the biggest European hits of the 1970s. In Germany, there is a tradition to dance to "Moviestar" during weddings, something Harpo finds odd as the song does not make any references to love. The song and Harpo have gained a cult following amongst Germans which has led Harpo to return to the country very often in later years.

In 1980, Harpo largely retired from the music industry after an accident with a horse that made him lose his sense of smell and blinded one of his eyes. "Moviestar" contributed to Harpo legally changing his name to include his nickname. Upon the single becoming a hit, he received tons of fan mail which led to confusion amongst mail carriers delivering to his ranch. In response to one who said he was committing misconduct by delivering the letter, Harpo legally incorporated his nickname into his legal name as a middle name.

The tune from "Moviestar" was used by Dutch artist Alexander Klerx, changing the title to "Leugenaar" or Liar, and subject matter to a tale of romantic betrayal

== Personnel ==
Musician credits taken from the 1976 album Moviestar unless noted:

- Harpo – lead vocals, guitar
- Bengt Palmers – production, arrangement, guitar, bass guitar
- Finn Sjöberg – guitar
- Göran Fristorp – guitar
- Janne Lindgren – steel guitar
- Mike Watson – bass guitar
- Rutger Gunnarsson – bass guitar
- Derek Skinner – drums
- Erik Romantschicz – drums
- Roger Palm – drums
- Kjell Öhman – keyboards
- Per-Erik Hallin – keyboards
- Jan Bandel – percussion
- Lorentz Larsson – oboe
- Anni-Frid Lyngstad – backing vocals
- Lena Ericsson – backing vocals
- Björn Norén – engineer

== Charts ==
=== Weekly charts ===
Weekly chart performance for "Moviestar"
| Chart (1975–1976) | Peak position |
|---|---|
| Australia (Kent Music Report) | 3 |
| Austria (Disc Parade) | 1 |
| Belgium (Ultratop 50 Flanders) | 3 |
| Belgium (Ultratop 50 Wallonia) | 19 |
| Denmark (Danmarks Radio) | 3 |
| Denmark (Tipparaden) | 1 |
| Finland (Suomen virallinen lista) | 10 |
| Ireland (IRMA) | 13 |
| Netherlands (Dutch Top 40) | 2 |
| Netherlands (Single Top 100) | 3 |
| New Zealand (Recorded Music NZ) | 9 |
| Norway (VG-lista) | 1 |
| Rhodesia (Lyons Maid) | 4 |
| Switzerland (Schweizer Hitparade) | 1 |
| Sweden (Topplistan) | 1 |
| Sweden (Svensktoppen) | 1 |
| UK Singles (Official Charts) | 24 |
| West Germany (GfK) | 1 |

=== Year-end charts ===
1975 year-end chart performance for "Moviestar"
| Chart (1975) | Position |
|---|---|
| Belgium (Ultratop) | 56 |
| Denmark (Tipparaden) | 20 |
| Netherlands (Dutch Top 40) | 53 |
| Netherlands (Single Top 100) | 45 |

1976 year-end chart performance for "Moviestar"
| Chart (1976) | Position |
|---|---|
| Australia (Kent Music Report) | 30 |
| Denmark (Danmarks Radio) | 5 |
| Sweden (Svensktoppen) | 4 |
| West Germany (Media Control) | 11 |

1997 year-end chart performance for "Moviestar"
| Chart (1997) | Position |
|---|---|
| Sweden (Topplistan) | 94 |
