= Harpo (singer) =

Musical artist

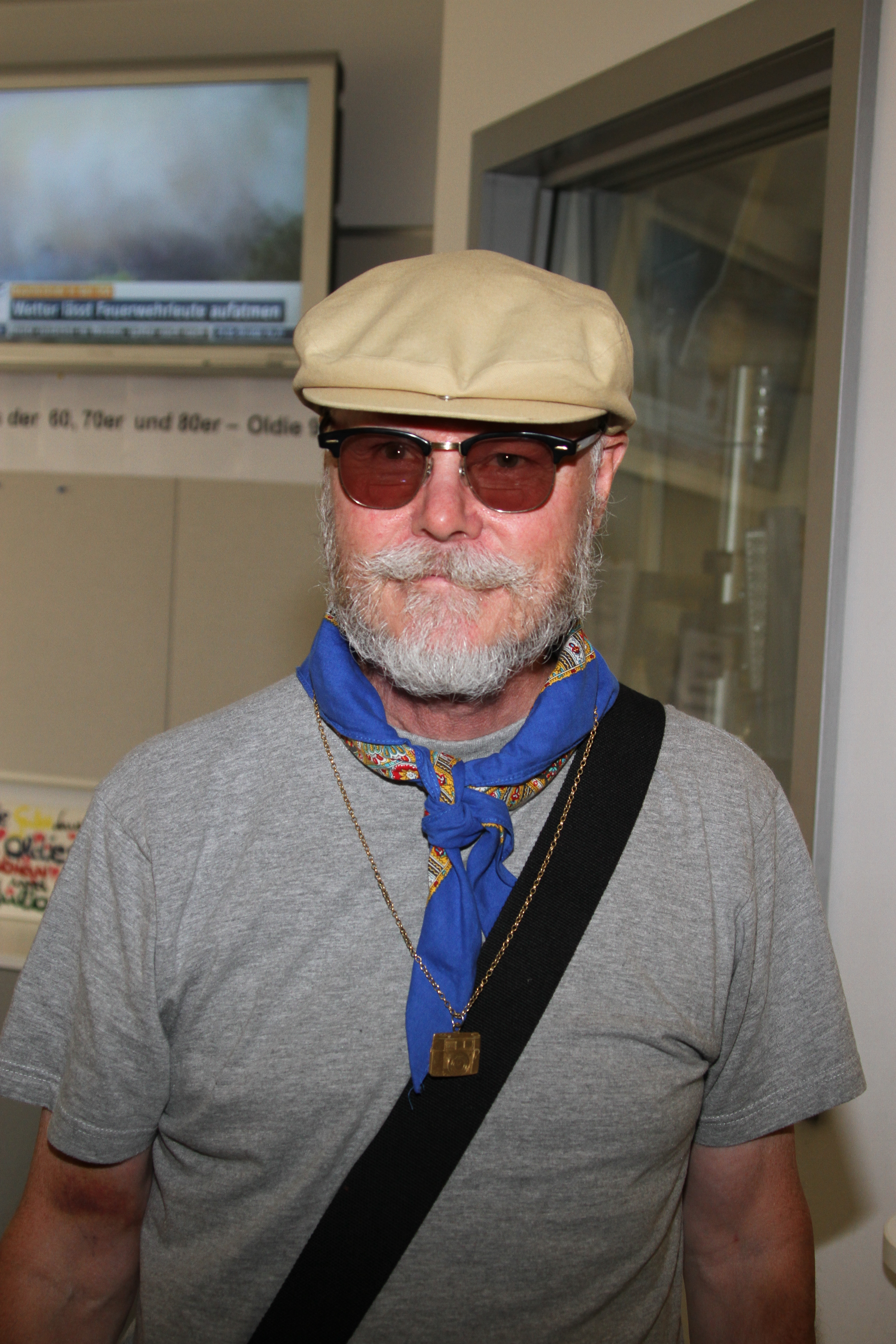
- Harpo in 2012

Background information
- Born: Jan Torsten Svensson; 5 April 1950 (age 76); Bandhagen, Stockholm, Sweden
- Genres: Pop; rock; schlager
- Occupations: Singer
- Instrument: Vocals
- Years active: 1973–present
- Label: EMI
- Website: www.harpo.info

Jan Torsten Svensson, known professionally as Harpo (born 5 April 1950), is a Swedish pop singer. He was popular in Sweden and around Europe in the 1970s and is best known for his worldwide hits "Moviestar" (1975) and "Horoscope" (1976). Harpo continued to work in the music business into the 2000s, releasing an album of new material in 2005 and continued to tour. He remains popular in Germany and has toured there since 2007.

== Career ==
Jan Svenssons artist name Harpo is a bow to American comedian Harpo Marx of The Marx Brothers. Harpo started his career in the late 1960s as an actor in children's theatre. While touring around Sweden, he started to write songs. In 1972, he signed a recording contract with Stig Anderson at Polar Music. Anderson assigned him to in-house record producers, Benny Andersson and Björn Ulvaeus.

The plan was that Andersson and Ulvaeus would work with Harpo on an album of his children's songs in Swedish. The collaboration did not work out and Anderson released Harpo from his contract. Harpo then signed with EMI and formed a successful creative partnership with producer Bengt Palmers.

Harpo released his first two singles in 1973 – "Honolulu" and "Sayonara". Both were hits and reached the Top Ten on the Tio-i-topp chart. "Sayonara" held the number one spot for five consecutive weeks between January and February 1974.

On 27 February 1975, Harpo recorded the song for which he would become most famous – "Moviestar". One of the backing vocalists on that session was Anni-Frid Lyngstad (Frida) from ABBA. It has sometimes been reported that Agnetha Fältskog also sang on the song but this is incorrect. The second female singer is Lena Ericsson, who also provided backing vocals on the song "Pin Up Girl" on Harpo's second album, Harpo & Bananaband.

"Moviestar" went on to become a huge hit. It reached number 1 in Sweden, Norway, Austria, Switzerland and West Germany, number 3 in Australia, number 9 in New Zealand, number 13 in Ireland and number 24 in the UK. A Swedish language version was also released in Sweden which went to number 1 on the Svensktoppen radio chart. He made many radio and TV appearances around Europe.

Harpo released a number of follow up singles, notably "Motorcycle Mama" (number 9 in Germany) and "Horoscope" (number 1 in Denmark and number 3 in Germany).

In 1977, Harpo travelled to Los Angeles, U.S. with his wife and producer Bengt Palmers. The result was the album The Hollywood Tapes which spawned the hit single "Television". Also, in 1977, Harpo made the news when he refused to take part in the Swedish Military Service. As a result, he went to prison for one month.

In 1978, Harpo revisited the songs he was originally going to work on with Andersson and Ulvaeus in 1972. The result was the children's album Jan Banan och hans flygande matta. He followed this with an album of his favourite rock and roll songs. Both these projects were in the Swedish language.

In 1980, Harpo was ready to get back into mainstream pop music. He signed to Mickie Most's label, RAK and released one single, "She Loves It Too". In fact, Harpo had the chance to be on RAK as far back as 1973. He met with Most in London, but decided not to move to London at that time.

Harpo had an accident in August 1980. As well as being a musician, he is also a horse trainer and one of his horses, Starter, suddenly lashed out and kicked Harpo in the face several times. The injuries were so severe that Harpo lost his sense of smell and the sight in one eye. To show there were no hard feelings, Harpo dedicated his next album to his horse, Starter.

Harpo continued to record throughout the 1980s and into the early 1990s. During 1985, he produced several Swedish groups including Shanghai, Suzzies Orkester and +1. In 1987, he set up his own record company, Igloo Records.

After his 1992 album, things were quiet on the recording front. He released a single, "Sounds Like Love", in Germany only in 1994. In 1997, Harpo contributed two new songs to a greatest hits compilation album, Harpo Hits!

Harpo released his latest album of new material, Jan Harpo Svensson 05 in April 2005. He had an extensive tour of Germany in 2007.

== Discography ==
=== Singles ===
Year	Single	Chart Positions					
Year	Single	AU	UK	SE	DE	DK	NL
1973	"Honolulu"	-	-	-	-	-	-
1973	"Sayonara"	-	-	1	-	-	-
1974	"My Teenage Queen"	-	-	-	-	-	-
1974	"Baby Boomerang"	-	-	-	-	-	-
1975	"Rock 'n' Roll Maskin"	-	-	-	-	-	-
1975	"Moviestar" (English version)	3	24	1	1	1	2
1975	"Moviestar" (Swedish version)	-	-	1	-	-	-
1975	"Motorcycle Mama"	-	-	8	9	-	-
1976	"Horoscope"	24	-	5	3	1	-
1976	"Rock 'n' Roll Clown"	80	-	-	12	-	-
1977	"Dandy"	-	-	-	-	-	-
1977	"In the Zum-Zum-Zummernight" (English version)	-	-	-	13	-	-
1977	"Som ett zom-zom-zommarbi" (Swedish version)	-	-	-	-	-	-
1977	"Television"	-	-	-	-	-	-
1977	"San Franciscan Nights"	-	-	-	-	-	-
1978	"With a Girl Like You"	-	-	-	-	-	-
1978	"Djungel-Jim"	-	-	-	-	-	-
1978	"Bianca"	-	-	-	-	-	-
1979	"Hjälp mig Rune"	-	-	-	-	-	-
1979	"Johanssons boogie woogie vals"	-	-	-	-	-	-
1980	"She Loves It Too"	-	-	-	-	-	-
1981	"Yes I Do"	-	-	-	-	-	-
1981	"Records and Tapes"	-	-	-	-	-	-
1982	"Rain and Thunder"	-	-	-	-	-	-
1983	"Light a Candle"	-	-	-	-	-	-
1985	"Summer of '85"	-	-	-	-	-	-
1986	"På andra sidan Atlanten"	-	-	-	-	-	-
1987	"Living Legends"	-	-	-	-	-	-
1987	"Tear Gas"	-	-	-	-	-	-
1990	"Moviestar '90"	-	-	-	-	-	-
1991	"Down at the Club"	-	-	-	-	-	-
1992	"Lycka" (with Ted Gärdestad)	-	-	-	-	-	-
1994	"Sounds Like Love"	-	-	-	-	-	-
1997	"Christmas"	-	-	-	-	-	-
1999	"Sayonara" (remix)	-	-	-	-	-	-
2000	"Honolulu"	-	-	-	-	-	-
2000	"Love Is Just a Game" (Unreleased)	-	-	-	-	-	-
2005	"Här är ängarna"	-	-	-	-	-	-
2021	"Stark & sårbar"	-	-	-	-	-	-
2021	"Sunkissed"	-	-	-	-	-	-

=== Albums ===
- Leo the Leopard (1974)
- Harpo & Bananaband (1975)
- Moviestar (1975) – AUS No. 65
- Smile (1976)
- The Hollywood Tapes (1977)
- Jan Banan och hans flygande matta (1978)
- Råck änd råll rätt å slätt (1979) (credited to Jan Harpo Svensson)
- The Fool of Yesterday (Will Be the Fool of Tomorrow) (1981)
- Let's Get Romantic (1984)
- Harpo (1988) (sometimes incorrectly referred to as Igloo or London)
- Hemliga låden (1990) (credited to Harpo Show)
- Harpo (1992) (not to be confused with the 1988 album of the same name)
- Jan Harpo Svensson 05 (2005) (credited to Jan Harpo Svensson)

=== Compilation albums ===
- Harpo Hits (1977)
- 20 Bästa (1980)
- Portrait of Harpo (1991)
- Moviestar Greatest Hits (1993)
- Samlade Hits (1995) (CD that contains the whole Let's Get Romantic album plus four other hits)
- Moviestar (1996)
- Harpo Hits! (1997)
- Premium Gold Collection (1999)
- Moviestar: The HitStory of Harpo (1999)
- The Collection (2001)
- Klassiker (2003)
