= Rediffusion Singapore =

Radio Station in Singapore

Coordinates: 1.2826°N 103.8349°E

Rediffusion Singapore (Chinese: 丽的呼声) was the first cable-transmitted radio station in Singapore. Started in 1949, it was a Singapore subsidiary of the Broadcast Relay Services (Overseas) Ltd. It was also Singapore's only subscription radio service.

Rediffusion Singapore was once considered the "prime entertainment organisation". It was also known as "The Box", as its so-called devices were found in over 100,000 homes.

Due to declining subscription, it closed in 2012. On closure, a former Rediffusion Singapore deejay, Eva Chang Mei Hsiang, bought the radio station and in 2013 re-opened the radio station as an online radio station.

== History ==
Rediffusion Singapore was founded in 1949 as a result of the success encountered in radio broadcasting in Singapore, particularly in the post-World War II era. The cable radio service was seen as a remedy against poor reception which affected certain housing estates until then. Rediffusion Singapore was operated by Overseas Rediffusion, a subsidiary of the Rediffusion broadcasting business based in the United Kingdom, from the former's foundation until the late 1980s, when the British-owned Rediffusion conglomerate was broken up.

Rediffusion started its wired service on 1 August 1949 with two networks, Gold (Chinese) and Silver (English, Malay and Tamil plus seven additional Chinese varieties).

In October 1979, as part of the Speak Mandarin Campaign, Rediffusion began airing Mandarin lessons in Cantonese, Hokkien and Teochew, in collaboration with Nanyang Siang Pau and Sin Chew Jit Poh. Rediffusion had more than 500,000 listeners, most of them speak in non-Mandarin Chinese varieties. Rediffusion would begin to gradually reduce programming in the non-Mandarin varieties which were at 40% at the time the lessons were aired, previously at 80%.

In 1989, Rediffusion was sold from the local subsidiary of British Electric Traction to the British company Yorkshire Radio Network for the sum of $9 million. The new owner would help revitalise the station. On the same year, Rediffusion applied for a licence for "wireless broadcasting", but was rejected due to the lack of usable FM frequencies.

As an attempt to get rid of the old "matriarch" image of Rediffusion, its Mandarin programmes were refreshed in 1989 and began to cater to young Mandarin-speaking listeners.

As of 1990, Rediffusion Singapore had 60,000 subscribers and 209,000 listeners.

Responding to the increase of radio stations and competition, Rediffiusion's Silver channel became all-English channel in December 1990, targeting the non-working population, specifically the retirees and the handicapped. It took two years to plan for the change.

Since 2000, Rediffusion Singapore provided digital radio services in Singapore.

On 15 April 2005, the Media Development Authority issued a five-year licence to Rediffusion Singapore for a subscriber-only Digital Audio Broadcasting service, making it the world's first.

In September 2008, Rediffusion Singapore launched Redistar, a radio station playing local music.

Rediffusion went off-air on 30 April 2012 but it resumed broadcasting on 11 November 2013 using the internet to transmit their programs.

== See also ==
- Rediffusion
- Associated-Rediffusion
- Rediffusion Television (Hong Kong, now known as Asia Television)
- Red FM (Malaysia): former Rediffusion Malaysia
- Starcom Network - formerly Radio Distribution (Barbados) Limited
