= Middle of the Road (band) =

British pop group

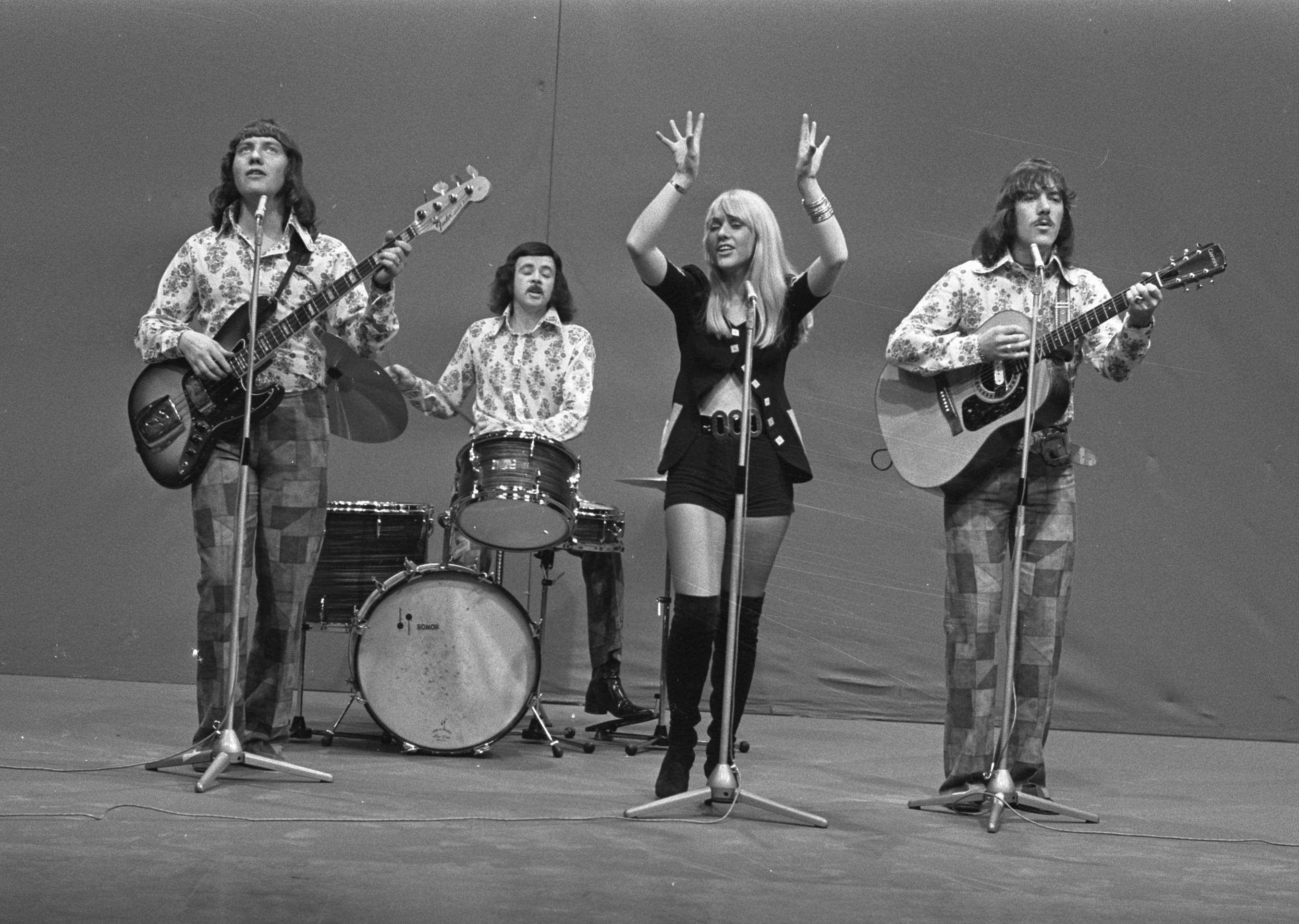
- Middle of the Road in 1972

Background information
- Also known as: Part 4 (1967); Los Caracas (1968–1970)
- Origin: Glasgow, Scotland
- Genres: Bubblegum music, Europop
- Years active: 1968–present
- Labels: RCA (1970–1973); Ariola (1973–1976)
- Members: Sally Carr; Lorna Osborne; Ian McCredie; Stuart McCredie; Stephan Ebn
- Past members: Ken Andrew; Eric McCredie; Linda Carroll; Lorraine Fehlberg; Neil Henderson
- Website: middleoftheroad-popgroup.com

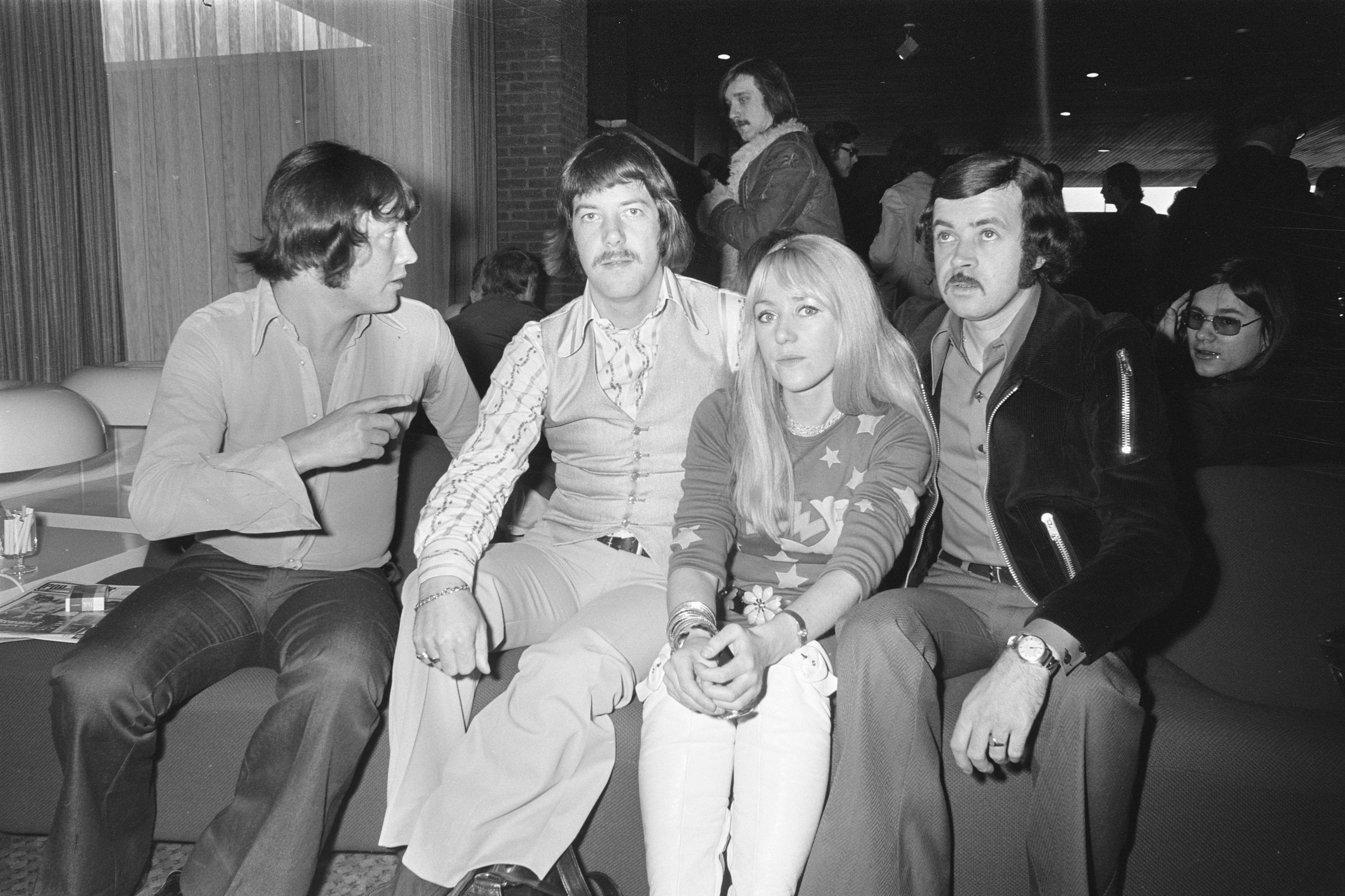
Middle of the Road, 1972.

Middle of the Road are a Scottish pop group who have enjoyed success across Europe and Latin America since the 1970s. Before ABBA established themselves in the mid-'70s, Middle of the Road were the sound of early Europop with their distinctive harmonies and lead vocals from Sally Carr. Four of their singles sold over one million copies each, and received a gold disc: "Chirpy Chirpy Cheep Cheep". "Sacramento", "Tweedle Dee, Tweedle Dum" and "Soley Soley". By early 1972 the group had sold over five million records.

== History ==
Original lead singer Sally Carr, drummer Ken Andrew, guitarist Ian McCredie, and his bassist brother Eric McCredie founded the band on 1 April 1970 in Glasgow, Scotland. They had already played together under the name Part Four since 1967 and later in Latin American style under the name Las Caracas. Under the name Las Caracas they won the UK TV talent show Opportunity Knocks. They moved to Italy in 1970 because they had not found success in the United Kingdom. There they met the Italian music producer Giacomo Tosti, who gave the band their distinctive sound and gave them their international break.

The band had their first and biggest hit record in the United Kingdom with their debut UK single, "Chirpy Chirpy Cheep Cheep". The song reached No. 1 in the UK Singles Chart in June 1971 and stayed there for four more weeks. In all, Middle of the Road had five hit singles in the UK in 1971 and 1972. The band had especially strong success in Germany, where they achieved eleven Top 40 hits between 1971 and 1974. As an example of this, Frank Valdor was fast to adapt "Sacramento" as his "party records". "Chirpy Chirpy Cheep Cheep" and "Sacramento" were played a lot on Scandinavian radio. In the Dutch Daverende 30 the group had four number 1 hits in between 1971 and 1973. In Europe, Sheila (French singer) best known in the UK for her 1979 Nile Rogers'-produced disco hit Spacer)under the name Sheila and B. Devotion had a big hit with Les Rois Mages, (her French cover of Tweedle Dum, Tweedle Dee) and again with Samson et Delila, while Nana Mouskouri covered Soley Soley (Oh, Soleil Soleil in French).

In 1974, early Bay City Rollers member Neil Henderson joined the band on guitar. He wrote and co-wrote songs for Middle of the Road, including the singles "Rockin' Soul" and "Everybody Loves a Winner" and 1974 albums, You Pays Yer Money and You Takes Yer Chance and Postcard, all released in Germany via Ariola like their first German LP, Music Music.

Carr left the group in 1977, and was replaced by Linda Carroll, who sang on the Something Old Something New album (1981), and several singles released between 1977 and 1981. Carroll left the group in 1981.

=== Later activity ===
In 2016, Middle of the Road's founding guitarist Ian McCredie accepted a Living Legends Award on behalf of the group at the Scottish Music Awards in Glasgow. In 2017, Middle of the Road released their first single in over 20 years, a live recording of their 1970s hit "Soley Soley", performed in front of 20,000 people in Berlin's Waldbühne amphitheatre.

Neil Henderson died on 20 September 2026, aged 73.

== Members ==
=== Current members ===
- Sally Carr (born Sarah Cecilia Carr, 28 March 1945, Muirhead, Lanarkshire) – vocals, percussion (1968–1977, 1981, 1991, 2017–present)
- Ken Andrew (born Kenneth Ballentyne Andrew, 28 August 1942, Bearsden, Glasgow) – drums, backing vocals (1968–1978, 1981, 1991, 2017–present)
- Ian McCredie (born Ian Campbell McCredie, 15 July 1947, Partick, Glasgow) – guitar, flute, backing vocals (1968–present)
- Lorna Osborne (born Lorna Bannon) – vocals (1981–present)
- Stuart McCredie – guitar, backing vocals (1984–present)
- Stephan Ebn – drums, backing vocals (2001–present)

=== Former members ===
- Eric McCredie (born Eric Campbell McCredie, 17 July 1945, Partick, Glasgow; died 6 October 2007, Glasgow) – bass, vocals (1968–1991)
- Neil Henderson (born Neil Fulton Henderson, 11 February 1953, Glasgow; died 20 September 2026) – guitar (1974–?)
- Anne Katherine Watson (born Anne Thomson, 2 December 1951, Partick, Glasgow) – for a time in 1975 as guest keyboard player and vocalist and who did session work
- Linda Carroll – vocals (1977–1981)
