= Greatest Hits (War album) =

Greatest hits album by War
- Released: September 1976
- Genre: Funk; soul; R&B
- Length: 42:49
- Label: United Artists (US); Island (UK and South Africa); LAX Records (Spain); Columbia (Canada); CBS (Netherlands and Germany)

War chronology
Why Can't We Be Friends? (1975)	Greatest Hits (1976)	Love Is All Around (1976)

Singles from Greatest Hits
- 1. "Summer" Released: June 21, 1976

Greatest Hits is a 1976 greatest hits album by the American band War, released in September 1976, by United Artists in the United States. In 2021, the compilation was reissued with an extra disc and was retitled Greatest Hits 2.0.

== Reception ==
Professional ratings
Review scores
Source	Rating
AllMusic	4.5/5 stars
The Encyclopedia of Popular Music	4/5 stars
MusicHound	4/5 stars

Billboard magazine wrote that the compilation "recaps this distinctive group's amalgam sound of pop, funk, Latin and soul elements", concluding that "This group's potent appeal in both the pop and soul fields should ensure cash register action".

== Track listing ==
Side one
No.	Title	Album	Length
1.	"All Day Music"	All Day Music (1971)	3:59
2.	"Slippin' into Darkness"	All Day Music	3:47
3.	"The World Is a Ghetto"	The World Is a Ghetto (1972)	3:59
4.	"The Cisco Kid"	The World Is a Ghetto	3:47
5.	"Gypsy Man"	Deliver the Word (1973)	5:23

Side two
No.	Title	Album	Length
1.	"Me and Baby Brother"	Deliver the Word	3:30
2.	"Southern Part of Texas"	Deliver the Word	3:55
3.	"Why Can't We Be Friends?"	Why Can't We Be Friends? (1975)	3:49
4.	"Low Rider"	Why Can't We Be Friends?	3:11
5.	"Summer"	New song	6:38

== Personnel ==
According to Tidal:

- B.B. Dickerson – bass, vocals
- Harold Brown – drums, vocals
- Howard Scott – guitar, vocals
- Lonnie Jordan – guitar (all but track 2), keyboards, vocals
- Lee Oskar – harmonica, vocals
- "Papa" Dee Allen – vocals
- Charles Miller – woodwind

== Charts ==
Chart performance for Greatest Hits
Chart (1976)	Peak position
US Billboard 200	6
US Top R&B/Hip-Hop Albums (Billboard)	12

== Certifications ==
Region	Certification	Certified units/sales
United States (RIAA)	Platinum	1,000,000^{^}
^{^} Shipments figures based on certification alone.
