= A Knight's Tale =

2001 film by Brian Helgeland

- Theatrical release poster
- Directed by: Brian Helgeland
- Written by: Brian Helgeland
- Based on: "The Knight's Tale" by Geoffrey Chaucer
- Produced by: Todd Black; Brian Helgeland; Tim Van Rellim
- Starring: Heath Ledger; Mark Addy; Rufus Sewell; Paul Bettany; Alan Tudyk
- Cinematography: Richard Greatrex
- Edited by: Kevin Stitt
- Music by: Carter Burwell
- Production companies: Columbia Pictures; Escape Artists; Finestkind Productions
- Distributed by: Sony Pictures Releasing
- Release date: May 11, 2001
- Running time: 132 minutes
- Country: United States
- Language: English
- Budget: $65 million
- Box office: $117.5 million

A Knight's Tale is a 2001 American medieval action comedy film written, co-produced and directed by Brian Helgeland. The film stars Heath Ledger as William Thatcher, a peasant squire who poses as a knight and competes in tournaments, winning accolades and acquiring friendships with such historical figures as Edward the Black Prince (James Purefoy) and Geoffrey Chaucer (Paul Bettany). Its 14th-century story is intentionally anachronistic, with many modern pop culture references and a soundtrack featuring 1970s music. The film takes its name from Chaucer's story "The Knight's Tale", part of The Canterbury Tales, and also draws several plot points from Chaucer's work.

A Knight's Tale was released by Columbia Pictures in the United States on May 11, 2001. It received mixed reviews from critics and grossed $117.5 million against a budget of $65 million.

== Plot ==
At a jousting tournament in 14th-century Europe, squires William Thatcher, Roland, and Wat discover that their master, Sir Ector, has died of dysentery. With one more pass, he could have won the tournament. Destitute, William wears Sir Ector's armor to impersonate him, winning the tournament and taking the prize.

Although only nobles are allowed in tournaments, William is inspired to compete and win more prizes. Roland and Wat would rather take their winnings and leave, but William convinces them to stay and help him train. While traveling, they encounter a young Geoffrey Chaucer, who is also destitute and agrees to forge a patent of nobility so William can enter, assuming the name of "Sir Ulrich von Liechtenstein" from Gelderland. But William is brought before Simon the Summoner and Peter the Pardoner: Chaucer has a gambling problem and is in their debt. William demands Chaucer be released and promises payment.

During the competition, William's armor is badly damaged; he goads Kate, a female blacksmith, into repairing it on credit. He wins the tournament's sword event, enabling him to pay Chaucer's debt. In the joust, he faces Sir Thomas Colville, who withdraws from the tournament after being injured by William, though they exchange a ceremonial pass so that Colville can retain the honour of never having failed to complete a match.

The proceedings are observed by Jocelyn, a noblewoman with whom William has become infatuated, and Count Adhemar of Anjou, a rival both in the joust and for Jocelyn's heart. In the final joust, Adhemar defeats William by knocking his helmet off. William vows revenge, but Adhemar taunts him, "You have been weighed, you have been measured, and you have been found wanting."

William is invited to a banquet and Kate shows him how to dance. There, he meets with Jocelyn again and, once more, Adhemar attempts to humiliate Will. The attempt backfires as Will stuns the audience with his dancing.

Kate joins William's party and forges new lightweight armor. In the following tournament, Adhemar and William are both assigned to tilt against Sir Thomas Colville, but they learn that he is actually Prince Edward, the heir apparent to the English throne. Unwilling to risk harming him, Adhemar withdraws; but William chooses to joust against Edward anyway and then addresses him by name, further earning his respect.

Adhemar is called away to the Battle of Poitiers, and William achieves several victories in his absence. William proves his love for Jocelyn by complying when she first asks him to deliberately lose (in contrast to knights who promise to win "in her name"), and then, just before he would be eliminated, to win the tournament after all.

The group travels to London for the World Championship. William recalls leaving his father to squire for Sir Ector and learn to become a knight, hoping to "change his stars." Adhemar has also arrived in London and announces that he is in negotiations with Jocelyn's father for her hand in marriage. William dominates at the tournament, but is seen visiting his now-blind father by Adhemar. Adhemar alerts the authorities to William's true identity. As William prepares to compete, his friends urge him to flee, and Jocelyn, now regardless of Will's true identity, urges Will to flee with her. Will refused to run and headed to the tourney, determined to compete.

William is arrested, locked in a cell where he is chastised by Adhemar, and placed in the town square pillory, but is defended from the hostile crowd by his friends. Just as the mob reaches its frenzy, Prince Edward reveals himself. He acknowledges William's honour and ability to inspire his friends' dedication that is in the best traditions of knighthood. Edward then announces that William is in fact descended from an ancient noble family, and knights him "Sir William". He asserts that as Prince-royal, his declaration is "beyond contestation".

William returns to the tournament to face Adhemar in the final match, but Adhemar cheats with an illegally sharpened lance, seriously injuring William. Entering the final pass, William is losing by two lances and must unhorse Adhemar to win. He demands to be stripped of his armor while Chaucer buys time by performing the introduction of William that he omitted earlier. William, unable to hold the lance due to his injuries, asks Wat to strap it to his arm.

Finally, William tilts against Adhemar, with his father and Jocelyn in attendance. Bellowing his true name as he charges, Will knocks Adhemar to the ground with a crushing blow; Adhemar experiences a vision of William and his friends mockingly telling him that he has been "weighed, measured, and found wanting". With this final blow, William wins the world championship. In the ensuing celebration, as Jocelyn and William embrace, Chaucer remarks that he should write an account of these events.

After the credits, Roland, Wat, Chaucer, and Kate are sitting in an attic having a flatulence contest.

== Cast ==
- Heath Ledger as William Thatcher, a squire to the late Sir Ector, who masquerades as 'Sir Ulrich von Liechtenstein of Gelderland'
- Mark Addy as Roland, a squire to the late Sir Ector and a loyal friend of William
- Rufus Sewell as Count Adhemar of Anjou, a wealthy, battle hardened knight who believes Sir Ulrich (William) would be a "lesser" knight, taunting William in front of Jocelyn and the public
- Paul Bettany as Geoffrey Chaucer, a big-headed writer and ring announcer
- Shannyn Sossamon as Jocelyn, a lady of noble birth, bound to the church but enjoys the fun and tricks in life
- Alan Tudyk as Wat, a squire to the late Sir Ector, obsessed with the greater things in life
- Laura Fraser as Kate, a hard-working widowed blacksmith who joins William to prove that her armor is better than her competitors
- Scott Handy as Germaine, Adhemar's ring announcer
- Christopher Cazenove as John Thatcher, William's father
- Bérénice Bejo as Christiana, Jocelyn's loyal friend and lady-in-waiting
- James Purefoy as Colville, (attempted) incognito alias of Edward the Black Prince

In addition, Nick Brimble appears as Sir Ector briefly at the start, and again later in a flashback to the start of the William's journey, a noble knight whose untimely death sets the plot in motion.

== Production ==
A Knight's Tale was filmed entirely on location in the Czech Republic at Barrandov Studios, Prague, during the summer of 2000. There, while the film was in production, Heath Ledger met Heather Graham during her simultaneous filming of From Hell.

Lances were created that would convincingly explode upon impact without injuring the stunt riders. The body of each lance was scored so it would break easily, and the tips were made of balsa wood. Each was also hollowed out, with the holes filled with balsa splinters and uncooked linguine.

Director Brian Helgeland says in the DVD Special Edition's commentary that he had intended to show what Geoffrey Chaucer might have been doing that inspired him to write The Canterbury Tales during the six months in which Chaucer seems to have gone missing in 1372.

Heath Ledger's principal suit of armor was made in steel by UK-based Armordillo Ltd. They also created several stunt replicas of this armor, Count Adhemar's armor, and all the jousting armors for men and horses in lightweight, flexible, and nearly unbreakable polyurethane resin.

== Music ==
The film, which notionally is set during the High Middle Ages, is notable for its deliberately anachronistic use of classic rock and funk songs in its soundtrack. The ten that were credited in the film are listed in order of appearance:

- "We Will Rock You" – Queen
- "Low Rider" – War
- "Takin' Care of Business" – Bachman–Turner Overdrive
- "Golden Years" – David Bowie
- "Further on Up the Road" – Eric Clapton
- "Get Ready" – Rare Earth
- "I Want to Take You Higher" – Sly and the Family Stone
- "The Boys Are Back in Town" – Thin Lizzy
- "You Shook Me All Night Long" – AC/DC
- "We Are the Champions" – Robbie Williams & Queen

In addition, the film's score makes use of the work of Estonian composer Arvo Pärt, his composition Fratres (Brothers) being heard in the scene in which William is knighted by Prince Edward.

=== Soundtrack ===
A Knight's Tale: Music from the Motion Picture

Soundtrack album by Various Artists
- Released: May 8, 2001
- Genres: Rock, country, pop
- Label: Columbia
- Producers: Brian Helgeland (exec.); Glen Brunman (exec.); Lia Vollack (exec.); John Kalodner (exec.)

Track Listing
No.	Title	Writer(s)	Artist(s)	Length
1.	"We Will Rock You"	Brian May	Queen	2:14
2.	"Low Rider"	Thomas Sylvester "Papa Dee" Allen, Harold Ray Brown, Morris "B.B." Dickerson, Leroy Jordan, Charles Miller, Lee Oskar, Howard E. Scott, and Jerry Goldstein	War	3:11
3.	"Takin' Care of Business"	Randy Bachman	Bachman-Turner Overdrive	4:50
4.	"Golden Years"	David Bowie	David Bowie	3:27
5.	"Ramble On"	Jimmy Page and Robert Plant	Train	4:35
6.	"Crazy On You"	Ann Wilson and Nancy Wilson	Heart	4:50
7.	"Further Up On The Road"	Don D. Robey and Joe Medwick Veasey	Eric Clapton ft. Robbie Robertson	4:29
8.	"Get Ready"	Smokey Robinson	Rare Earth	2:50
9.	"I Want To Take You Higher"	Sylvester Stewart	Sly & The Family Stone	5:20
10.	"The Boys Are Back in Town"	Phil Lynott	Thin Lizzy	4:28
11.	"One Of Your Own (score)"	Carter Burwell	Carter Burwell	1:53
12.	"We Are The Champions"	Freddie Mercury	Queen and Robbie Williams	3:54
13.	"Pieces of My Heart"	Dan Powell and Adam Smalley	Dan Powell	3:28
14.	"Eye Conqueror"	Arion Salazar	Third Eye Blind	4:07

Tracks 5, 6, 13, and 14 do not appear in the actual film while You Shook Me All Night Long by AC/DC appears in the film, but is not on the soundtrack.

=== Year-end charts ===
Year-end chart performance for A Knight's Tale
Chart (2001)	Peak position
Canadian Albums (Nielsen SoundScan)	127

=== Certifications ===
Region	Certification	Certified units/sales
United States (RIAA)	Gold	500,000^{^}
^{^} Shipments figures based on certification alone.

== Release ==
=== Home media ===
A Knight's Tale was released on DVD and VHS on September 25, 2001, with the VHS release being delayed by three days to September 28 when Sony took down a Spider-Man teaser trailer that was recalled due to the September 11 attacks.

On May 20, 2025, the Ultra HD Blu-ray discs were released by Sony featuring the theatrical cut and extended cut.

== Reception ==
=== Critical reception ===
Review aggregation website Rotten Tomatoes gives the film a score of 60% based on reviews from 153 critics, with an average rating of 5.90/10. The website's critical consensus says, "Once you get past the anachronism, A Knight's Tale becomes a predictable, if spirited, Rocky on horseback." On Metacritic, the film holds a score of 56 out of 100, sampled from 36 reviews, indicating "mixed or average" reviews. Audiences polled by CinemaScore gave the film an average grade of "B+" on an A+ to F scale.

Roger Ebert gave the film 3 stars out of 4 and argued that the anachronisms made little difference, writing that the director himself "pointed out that an orchestral score would be equally anachronistic, since orchestras hadn't been invented in the 1400s." In an obituary for David Bowie, culture critic Anthony Lane referred to the film's use of the song "Golden Years" as "the best and most honest use of anachronism that I know of."

Newsweek revealed in June 2001 that print ads contained glowing comments from a film reviewer who did not exist for at least four films released by Columbia Pictures, including A Knight's Tale and The Animal (2001). The fake critic was named David Manning and was created by a Columbia employee who worked in the advertising department. "Manning" was fraudulently presented as a reviewer for The Ridgefield Press, a small Connecticut weekly.

Bettany's performance as Geoffrey Chaucer was particularly praised, with Ed Power in i saying that "Bettany adds a hilarious zing to this tale of honour and destiny and steals the thunder of the stoic and reserved Ledger."

=== Box office ===
A Knight's Tale made $16.5 million during its opening weekend, ranking in second place behind The Mummy Returns. The film earned $56.6 million at the North American box office and an additional $60.9 million internationally, for a worldwide total of $117.5 million.

=== Awards ===
The film was nominated for three awards at the 2002 MTV Movie Awards. Shannyn Sossamon was nominated for Breakthrough Female performance, losing to Mandy Moore in A Walk to Remember. The film was also nominated for Best Kiss, and Best Musical Sequence, losing to American Pie 2 and Moulin Rouge!, respectively.

Bettany won the London Film Critics' Circle Award for British Supporting Actor of the Year. The film also took two Taurus World Stunt Awards for 'Hardest hit' and 'Best work with an animal'.

== Sequel ==
In 2012, a TV series adaptation was reported to be in development by American Broadcasting Company, written by Ronald D. Moore.

In April 2024, it was revealed that director Brian Helgeland had pitched a sequel to Netflix, who passed on the project.

== Musical adaptation ==
A musical adaptation of the movie had its world premiere in Manchester Opera House on 11 April 2025. The limited run ended on 10 May 2025 with an anticipated transfer to the West End at an as yet unannounced later date.
