= Why Can't We Be Friends? =

1975 album by War

Studio album by War
- Released: June 16, 1975
- Recorded: 1974
- Studios: Sound City (Van Nuys, California)
- Genres: Funk; rock
- Length: 44:04
- Label: United Artists
- Producers: Jerry Goldstein; Lonnie Jordan; Howard Scott

War chronology
War Live (1974)	Why Can't We Be Friends? (1975)	Greatest Hits (1976)

Singles from Why Can't We Be Friends?
- 1. "Why Can't We Be Friends?" Released: April 1975; 2. "Low Rider" Released: August 1975

Why Can't We Be Friends? is the seventh studio album by American band War, released on June 16, 1975, by United Artists Records. Two singles from the album were released: the title track backed with "In Mazatlan", and "Low Rider" backed with "So". Both A-sides were nominated for the Grammy Awards of 1976.

Of the songs on this album, an interpolation of the first part of the song "Smile Happy" was used in the song "It Wasn't Me" by Shaggy featuring RikRok. Versions of the album's titular song have been used in several film and TV productions, notably Bridge to Terabithia, The Final Destination, Wild Things and King of the Hill.

Professional ratings
Review scores
Source	Rating
AllMusic	4/5 stars
Christgau's Record Guide	B−

== Track listing ==
All tracks composed by War (Papa Dee Allen, Harold Brown, B.B. Dickerson, Lonnie Jordan, Charles Miller, Lee Oskar, Howard E. Scott), except where indicated. Note: The CD edition does not break "Leroy's Latin Lament" into sections.

1. "Don't Let No One Get You Down" (War, Jerry Goldstein) – 3:59
2. "Lotus Blossom" (War, Francie Nelson) – 3:59
3. "Heartbeat" – 7:25
4. "Leroy's Latin Lament (Medley)" - 6:36
  1. "Lonnie Dreams" – 0:49
  2. "The Way We Feel" (War, lyrics: Keri Oskar) – 1:10
  3. "La Fiesta" – 2:10
  4. "Lament" – 2:27
5. "Smile Happy" – 7:22
6. "So" – 4:58
7. "Low Rider" (War, Jerry Goldstein) – 3:11
8. "In Mazatlan" – 2:45
9. "Why Can't We Be Friends?" (War, Jerry Goldstein) – 3:49

== Personnel ==
Personnel taken from Why Can't We Be Friends? liner notes.

War

- Howard Scott – guitar, percussion, vocals
- B. B. Dickerson – bass, percussion, vocals
- Lonnie Jordan – organ, piano, RMI piano, timbales, percussion, vocals
- Harold Brown – drums, percussion, vocals (credit missing from LP cover)
- Papa Dee Allen – conga, bongos, percussion, vocals
- Charles Miller – clarinet, alto, tenor and baritone saxophones, percussion, vocals
- Lee Oskar – harmonica, percussion, vocals

Additional musicians

- Sharone Scott – backing vocals
- Milton James – backing vocals
- Moses Wheelock – backing vocals

Technical personnel

- Jerry Goldstein – producer
- Lonnie Jordan – associate producer
- Howard Scott – associate producer
- Ed Barton – recording engineer
- Andrew Berliner – recording engineer, mastering engineer
- Chris Huston – recording engineer
- Howard Miller – album cover art
- Lee Oskar – album cover concept
- Gary Sato – photography

== Charts ==
Year	Album	Chart positions		
Year	Album	US	US R&B	AUS
1975	Why Can't We Be Friends?	8	1	81

== See also ==
- List of Billboard number-one R&B albums of 1975
