= War (War album) =

Studio album by War
- Released: March 1971
- Recorded: 1971 at Wally Heider, San Francisco, California & Los Angeles, California
- Genre: Latin funk
- Length: 40:08
- Label: United Artists
- Producer: Jerry Goldstein

War chronology
| The Black-Man's Burdon (1970) | War (1971) | All Day Music (1971) |

Professional ratings
Review scores
| Source | Rating |
|---|---|
| AllMusic | 3.5/5 stars |

War is the third album by American band War, and their first following the departure of singer Eric Burdon and the group's name change from the original Eric Burdon and War. It was released in March 1971 on United Artists Records, their first for the label.

The album did not gain much attention upon release, but sales and critical acclaim picked up after their subsequent hit albums throughout the 1970s, the next appearing later in 1971. One single was taken from the album: "Lonely Feelin'" backed with "Sun Oh Son", which did not chart. Of the other songs, "War Drums" includes a chant of the band's name and appears to be an attempt at a group theme song; and "Fidel's Fantasy" generated some controversy over its spoken word monologue criticizing Fidel Castro.

== Cover art ==
The cover painting depicts many disembodied arms giving a three finger salute, a concept also used on the group's first album with Eric Burdon: Eric Burdon Declares "War". There are actually eight arms in the picture, but only seven people in the group, revealing that the artwork was commissioned when Burdon was still with them, confirmed by the cover notes which credit him for the concept. The cover art is by Norman Seeff. The back cover shows the same picture, mirror reversed. The original edition was printed on a linen textured cover slick, and has an inner gatefold photo of the band.

== Track listing ==
All tracks composed by War (Papa Dee Allen, Harold Brown, B.B. Dickerson, Lonnie Jordan, Charles Miller, Lee Oskar, Howard E. Scott). The album notes also mention that Hilton Valentine (of The Animals) helped with the lyrics to "Back Home".

Side one

1. "Sun Oh Son" – 5:57
2. "Lonely Feelin'" – 4:31
3. "Back Home" – 6:42

Side two

1. "War Drums" – 3:52
2. "Vibeka" – 8:03
3. "Fidel's Fantasy" – 11:03

== Personnel ==
War

- "Papa" Dee Allen – conga, bongos, percussion, vocals (monologue on "Fidel's Fantasy")
- Harold Brown – drums, percussion, vocals
- B.B. Dickerson – bass, vocals (lead on "Sun Oh Son")
- Lonnie Jordan – organ, piano, percussion, vocals (lead on "Lonely Feelin'")
- Charles Miller – flute, alto saxophone, baritone saxophone, tenor saxophone, percussion, vocals (lead on "Back Home")
- Lee Oskar – harmonica, vocals
- Howard Scott – guitar, percussion, vocals

Technical

- Jerry Goldstein – producer
- Chris Huston – engineer
