= Eric Burdon Declares "War" =

Studio album by Eric Burdon and War
- Released: April 1970
- Recorded: January 2–4, 1970 at Wally Heider, San Francisco, California
- Genre: Funk rock; blues; psychedelia
- Length: 41:45
- Label: MGM
- Producer: Jerry Goldstein

Eric Burdon chronology
Love Is (1968)	Eric Burdon Declares "War" (1970)	The Black-Man's Burdon (1970)

War chronology
Eric Burdon Declares "War" (1970)	The Black-Man's Burdon (1970)

Singles from Eric Burdon Declares "War"
- 1. "Spill the Wine" Released: May 1970; 2. "Tobacco Road" Released: 1970

Professional ratings
Review scores
Source	Rating
AllMusic	2/5 stars

Eric Burdon Declares "War" is the first of two original albums and debut studio album by American band Eric Burdon and War, released on MGM Records in April 1970. It peaked at number 18 on record charts in the USA, number 50 in the UK, and number 7 in Australia. The back cover includes this declaration: "We the People, have declared War against the People, for the right to love each other". The album received a gold record award.

In 1981, LA Records (producer Jerry Goldstein's own label) reissued the album under the title Spill the Wine. It has also been reissued under its original title on CD by Avenue / Rhino Records.

== Cover art ==
The cover, credited to The Visual Thing (with Burdon credited for the concept), depicts two disembodied but joined arms, one white and one black, both giving a three finger salute, similar to the peace sign which uses two fingers. The three fingers may represent the letter "w" in the word "war". This salute was also used on the cover of a future album, War. The use of a background sun also appears as a recurring theme on both front and back covers of The Black-Man's Burdon and the inner sleeve of Deliver the Word.

== Track listing ==
All tracks written by War (Papa Dee Allen, Harold Brown, Eric Burdon, B.B. Dickerson, Lonnie Jordan, Charles Miller, Lee Oskar, Howard E. Scott) except where noted. Note: Memphis Slim composed music under the name of Peter Chatman which was actually his father's name; on the original album the composer credit is misprinted as "P. Chapman".

Side one

1. "The Vision of Rassan" – 7:40
  1. "Dedication" – 2:33
  2. "Roll on Kirk" – 5:07
2. "Tobacco Road" – 14:24
  1. "Tobacco Road" (John D. Loudermilk) – 3:47
  2. "I Have a Dream" – 6:39
  3. "Tobacco Road" [reprise] (Loudermilk) – 3:58

Side two

1. "Spill the Wine" – 4:38
2. "Blues for Memphis Slim" – 13:08
  1. "Birth" – 1:31
  2. "Mother Earth" (Peter Chatman) – 2:46
  3. "Mr. Charlie" – 3:05
  4. "Danish Pastry" – 3:18
  5. "Mother Earth" [reprise] (Chatman) – 2:28
3. "You're No Stranger" (Thomas C. Carter) – 1:55

== Personnel ==
- Eric Burdon – lead vocals
- Lee Oskar – harmonica
- Charles Miller – tenor saxophone, flute
- Howard Scott – guitar, backing vocals
- Lonnie Jordan – organ, piano
- Bee Bee Dickerson – bass, backing vocals
- Harold Brown – drums
- Dee Allen – conga, percussion

== Production ==
- Jerry Goldstein – producer
- Chris Huston – engineer
