= War Live (album) =

Live album by War
- Released: February 1974
- Recorded: November 25, 1972
- Venue: High Chaparral, Chicago, Illinois
- Length: 76:26
- Label: United Artists
- Producer: Jerry Goldstein, Lonnie Jordan, Howard Scott

War chronology
Deliver the Word (1973)	War Live (1974)	Why Can't We Be Friends? (1975)

Professional ratings
Review scores
Source	Rating
AllMusic	4/5 stars
Christgau's Record Guide	C+

War Live is the first live album by American band War, recorded during a four-night engagement at Chicago's High Chapparral club and released as a double LP on United Artists Records in 1973. The album was reissued on Rhino Records as a double disc CD on 1992 September 15 and again on 2008 March 31.

The album contains a mere seven songs, including "Ballero" which was previously unreleased on an album. It had been released as a non-album single in 1973. Many of the songs appear in extended versions, two of them filling an LP side apiece. By the contrast, "Lonely Feelin'" appears as a short instrumental version of the song from the first War album of 1971. One single was taken from the album: "Ballero" / "Slippin' into Darkness" (both heavily edited for single release), which charted at No. 33 on the USA pop chart, and No. 17 on the R&B singles charts. The album sold 1.5 million copies.

== Cover art ==
The front cover shows a grid of 24 concert photos. A further 24 photos appear on the back, and 48 more on the inner gatefold. Early copies had no artist name or title on the cover (aside from the spine); this information appeared on a large yellow sticker attached to the shrink wrap. The sticker lists six of seven track titles. On later copies, the cover was modified to include an image of the sticker, now printed on the cover and covering part of the photo spread. Note that the exclamation mark after the title only appears on the sticker and later front covers; it does not appear on the spine or labels, and should not be considered as part of the title. On the CD reissue, the original front cover panel has been replaced by one of the inner sleeve panels.

== Track listing ==
All tracks composed by War. Except where indicated. (The first track has no credit.)

Side one

1. "Introductions by E. Rodney Jones of Radio Station WVON, Chicago, Ill." – 0:31
2. "Sun Oh Son" – 10:39
3. "The Cisco Kid" – 6:05
4. "(intro) Slippin' into Darkness" – 0:20

Side two

1. "Slippin' into Darkness" – 9:45
2. "Slippin' Part 2" – 8:51

Side three

1. "All Day Music" (War, Jerry Goldstein) – 10:09
2. "Ballero" – 8:29
3. "Lonely Feelin'" – 3:00
4. "(intro) Get Down" (War, Goldstein) – 0:07

Side four

1. "Get Down" (War, Goldstein) – 20:30

== Personnel ==
- Papa Dee Allen - congas, percussion
- Harold Brown - drums, percussion
- B.B. Dickerson - bass, vocals
- Lonnie Jordan -keyboards, vocals
- Charles Miller - saxophone, flute
- Lee Oskar - harmonica
- Howard E Scott - guitar, vocals
- Jerry Goldstein, Lonnie Jordon, Howard Scott – producers

== See also ==
- List of Billboard number-one R&B albums of 1974
