= Why Can't We Be Friends? (song) =

1975 single by War

Single by War

from the album Why Can't We Be Friends?
- B-side: "In Mazatlan"
- Released: April 1975
- Genre: Funk; pop; reggae; R&B; soul
- Length: 3:50
- Label: United Artists
- Songwriters: Papa Dee Allen; Harold Ray Brown; B. B. Dickerson; Lonnie Jordan; Charles Miller; Lee Oskar; Howard E. Scott; Jerry Goldstein
- Producer: Jerry Goldstein

War singles chronology
"Ballero" (1974)	"Why Can't We Be Friends?" (1975)	"Low Rider" (1975)

Music video
- Why Can't We Be Friends on YouTube

"Why Can't We Be Friends?" is a song by American funk band War, from their 1975 studio album Why Can't We Be Friends?. It has a simple structure, with the phrase "Why can't we be friends?" being sung four times after each two-line verse. The song reached No. 6 on the US Billboard Hot 100 in the summer of 1975, and uniquely features each band member singing his own verse. It was played in outer space when NASA beamed it to the linking of Soviet cosmonauts and US astronauts for the Apollo–Soyuz Test Project. Billboard magazine ranked it as the No. 24 song of that year.

== Charts ==
=== Weekly charts ===
Chart (1975)	Peak position
Australia (Kent Music Report)	93
Canada Top Singles (RPM)	6
US Billboard Hot 100	6
US Hot Soul Singles (Billboard)	9
US Cash Box Top 100	5

=== Year-end charts ===
Chart (1975)	Rank
Canada Top Singles (RPM)	75
US Billboard Hot 100	24

== Certifications ==
Region	Certification	Certified units/sales
United States (RIAA)	Gold	1,000,000^{^}
^{^} Shipments figures based on certification alone.

== Smash Mouth version ==
"Why Can't We Be Friends?"

Single by Smash Mouth

from the album Fush Yu Mang
- Released: January 12, 1998
- Genre: Ska punk; pop-punk; alternative rock
- Length: 4:46 (album version); 3:17 (radio edit)
- Label: Interscope
- Songwriters: Papa Dee Allen; Harold Ray Brown; B. B. Dickerson; Lonnie Jordan; Charles Miller; Lee Oskar; Howard E. Scott; Jerry Goldstein
- Producer: Eric Valentine

Smash Mouth singles chronology
"The Fonz" (1997)	"Why Can't We Be Friends?" (1998)	"Can't Get Enough of You Baby" (1998)

Music video
- "Why Can't We Be Friends?" on YouTube

American pop rock band Smash Mouth covered the song on their debut album, Fush Yu Mang (1997), and released it as the album's third single in January 1998 by Interscope Records.

=== Critical reception ===
Larry Flick from Billboard magazine wrote, "Hot on the heels of 'Walkin' On The Sun' comes a wonderfully festive, anthemic rendition of War's pop/R&B chestnut. The song's original funk-flavored arrangement proves perfectly accessible to Smash Mouth's pop/ska style. The heartfelt 'let's get along' tone of the lyrics remains as relevant as ever to today's social and political climate, and the band's rousing approach makes the message all the more user-friendly to the pop masses. Another sure-fire multi-format hit from the album Fush Yu Mang."

=== Charts ===
Chart (1998)	Peak position
Australia (ARIA)	67
Iceland (Íslenski Listinn Topp 40)	19
Netherlands (Dutch Top 40 Tipparade)	19
Netherlands (Single Top 100)	89
New Zealand (Recorded Music NZ)	39
Spain (AFYVE)	5
Sweden (Sverigetopplistan)	29
US Alternative Airplay (Billboard)	28
