= Deliver the Word =

Studio album by War
- Released: August 1973
- Recorded: 1973
- Studios: Crystal Industries & Wally Heider Studios, Los Angeles, California; Caribou Studios, Nederland, Colorado
- Genre: Jazz rock
- Length: 40:36
- Label: United Artists
- Producers: Jerry Goldstein, Lonnie Jordan, Howard Scott

War chronology
The World Is a Ghetto (1972)	Deliver the Word (1973)	War Live (1973)

Deliver the Word is the sixth album by War, released in 1973 on United Artists Records.

== Reception ==
Professional ratings
Review scores
Source	Rating
AllMusic	4/5 stars
Christgau's Record Guide	B+

The album featured two singles, "Gypsy Man" (severely truncated from the 11 minute album version) backed with "Deliver the Word" (US No. 8), and "Me and Baby Brother" backed with "In Your Eyes" (US No. 15). A live version of "Me and Baby Brother" had been released previously on All Day Music (1971). The title "H_{2}Overture" is a pun on H_{2}O, the chemical formula for water.

A 4-channel surround sound (quadraphonic) mix was also released for the album in the 8-track tape format (United Artists UA-DA128-H), featuring a different track order, a reprise of "H_{2}Overture" with early fade-out, and an early fade-out of "Gypsy Man".

== Cover art ==
The cover was printed using metallic silver ink on black, and the cover is textured, resembling black leather as used for the covers of Bibles (the album title being a phrase associated with the Bible). A die-cut window in the lower left corner reveals part of the inner sleeve which shows a human figure walking along a deserted beach with his head bowed. The other side of the inner sleeve shows the same picture, but mirror reversed, and tinted blue instead of orange. When the cover is inserted the other way around, the window reveals an empty beach with sunlight (which, in blue, looks like moonlight) reflecting off the water. The album design and photo is credited to Gary Sato, with Lee Oskar credited for cover concept.

== Track listing ==
All tracks composed by War (Papa Dee Allen, Harold Brown, B.B. Dickerson, Lonnie Jordan, Charles Miller, Lee Oskar, Howard E. Scott), except where indicated.

Side one

1. "H_{2}Overture" – 4:38
2. "In Your Eyes" – 4:22
3. "Gypsy Man" – 11:35

Side two

1. "Me and Baby Brother" – 3:30
2. "Deliver the Word" – 7:48
3. "Southern Part of Texas" (War, Jerry Goldstein) – 6:22
4. "Blisters" – 2:21

Quadraphonic tape edition

1. "Gypsy Man"
2. "H_{2}Overture"
3. "Southern Part of Texas"
4. "Me and Baby Brother"
5. "Deliver the Word"
6. "Blisters"
7. "H_{2}Overture (Reprise)"
8. "In Your Eyes"

== Personnel ==
War

- Howard Scott – guitar, percussion, vocals
- B.B. Dickerson – bass, percussion, vocals
- Lonnie Jordan – organ, piano, ARP violins, synthesizer, timbales, percussion, vocals
- Harold Brown – drums, percussion, vocals
- Papa Dee Allen – conga, bongos, percussion, vocals
- Charles Miller – clarinet, alto, tenor and baritone saxophones, flute, percussion, vocals
- Lee Oskar – harmonica, percussion, vocals

== Charts ==
Year	Album	Chart positions	
Year	Album	US	US R&B
1973	Deliver the Word	6	1

=== Singles ===
Year	Single	Chart positions	
Year	Single	US	US R&B
1973	"Gypsy Man"	8	6
1973	"Me and Baby Brother"	15 (1974)	18

== See also ==
- List of Billboard number-one R&B albums of 1973
