= The World Is a Ghetto =

Studio album by War
- Released: November 1972
- Recorded: 1972
- Studios: Crystal Industries, Los Angeles
- Genres: Psychedelic soul; jazz; progressive soul
- Length: 43:49
- Label: United Artists
- Producers: Jerry Goldstein, Lonnie Jordan, Howard E. Scott

War chronology
All Day Music (1971)	The World Is a Ghetto (1972)	Deliver the Word (1973)

The World Is a Ghetto is the fifth album by American band War, released in late 1972 on United Artists Records. The album attained the number one spot on Billboard, and was Billboard's Album of the Year as the best-selling album of 1973. In addition to being Billboard's number 1 album of 1973, the album was ranked number 444 on Rolling Stone's original list of "The 500 Greatest Albums of All Time". The album and title track both received RIAA gold certifications.

== Cover ==
The cover illustration, a light-hearted drawing showing a Rolls-Royce with a flat tire in a ghetto, was drawn by Howard Miller, with Lee Oskar credited with album concept.

It uses a blue and black color palette as a reference to the melancholy nature of the album.

== Alternate formats ==
The album was also made available in a 4-channel surround sound (quadraphonic) mix in the 8-track tape format (United Artists UA-DA178-H). The original quadraphonic mix has been re-released on Blu-ray, and for the album's 50th anniversary, a new Dolby Atmos mix was released in streaming format. Furthermore, a 50th Anniversary Collector's Edition was made available as 4 CDs, 5 LPs, or as a digital download, and contained bonus tracks as well as "making of" recordings from the album sessions.

== Critical reception ==
Professional ratings
Review scores
Source	Rating
AllMusic	4/5 stars
Christgau's Record Guide	B
Creem	C+
Pitchfork	8.8/10
Rolling Stone	4/5 stars

In a contemporary review for Rolling Stone, Gordon Fletcher said The World Is a Ghetto found War progressing further in the arena of soul and jazz music, and "closer to total mastery of their music as they attempt to use it to communicate the essence of ghetto life". Robert Christgau was less enthusiastic in Creem, believing he "should love this big Afro-roots band" in theory, but was critical of the fairly slow quality of the music and the lyrics, calling it "blackstrap-rock". He singled out the "jazz pretensions" of "Four Cornered Room" and "City, Country, City", finding the latter's rhythmic foundation solid but the song too long and mawkish.

In a retrospective review, Bruce Eder from AllMusic said the album's music encompassed "not only soul and funk but elements of blues and psychedelia" and a "classy, forward-looking production" comparable to Curtis Mayfield's 1970 album Curtis and Marvin Gaye's What's Going On (1971). The Crisis journalist Bruce Britt identified The World Is a Ghetto as one of the few Black rock recordings that became a classic within the pan-African community during FM rock radio's segregation of African-American rock acts in the 1970s, a viewpoint echoed by music historian Jefferson Morley. The Washington Post critic Geoffrey Himes names it an exemplary release of the progressive soul development from 1968 to 1973.

== Track listing ==
All tracks are written by War.

Side 1
No.	Title	Length
1.	"The Cisco Kid"	4:35
2.	"Where Was You At"	3:25
3.	"City, Country, City"	13:18

Side 2
No.	Title	Length
1.	"Four Cornered Room"	8:30
2.	"The World Is a Ghetto"	10:10
3.	"Beetles In The Bog"	3:51

2012 40th Anniversary CD Bonus Tracks
No.	Title	Length
1.	"Freight Train Jam"	5:41
2.	"58 Blues"	5:29
3.	"War Is Coming" (Blues Version)	6:15
4.	"The World Is a Ghetto" (Rehearsal Version)	8:06

== Personnel ==
War

- Howard Scott – guitar, percussion, vocals
- B.B. Dickerson – bass, percussion, vocals
- Lonnie Jordan – organ, piano, timbales, percussion, vocals
- Harold Brown – drums, percussion, vocals
- Papa Dee Allen – conga, bongos, percussion, vocals
- Charles Miller – clarinet, alto, tenor and baritone saxophones, percussion, vocals
- Lee Oskar – harmonica, percussion, vocals

== Charts ==
=== Weekly charts ===
Weekly chart performance for The World Is a Ghetto
Chart (1973)	Peak position
Canada (RPM Top 100)	7
US Billboard 200	1
US Top R&B/Hip-Hop Albums (Billboard)	1
US Top 100 Albums (Cash Box)	1
US The Album Chart (Record World)	1
US The R&B LP Chart (Record World)	1

=== Year-end charts ===
Year-end chart performance for The World Is a Ghetto
Chart (1973)	Position
US Billboard 200	1
US Top 100 Albums (Cash Box)	4
US The Album Chart (Record World)	3

== Certifications ==
Region	Certification	Certified units/sales
United States (RIAA)	Gold	500,000^{^}
^{^} Shipments figures based on certification alone.

== See also ==
- List of Billboard 200 number-one albums of 1973
- List of Billboard number-one R&B albums of 1973
