= Low Rider =

1975 song by War

- US single picture sleeve

Single by War

from the album Why Can't We Be Friends?
- B-side: "So"
- Released: June 1975
- Recorded: 1974
- Genre: Funk; Latin rock; funk rock; soul; R&B; mariachi
- Length: 3:11
- Label: United Artists
- Songwriters: Jerry Goldstein; War (Thomas Sylvester "Papa Dee" Allen; Harold Ray Brown; Moris "B.B." Dickerson; Lonnie Jordan; Charles Miller; Lee Oskar; Howard E. Scott)
- Producers: Jerry Goldstein; Lonnie Jordan; Howard E. Scott

War singles chronology
"Why Can't We Be Friends?" (1975)	"Low Rider" (1975)	"Me and Baby Brother" (1976)

Music video
- Low Rider on YouTube

"Low Rider" is a song written by American funk band War and record producer Jerry Goldstein, which appeared on their seventh studio album Why Can't We Be Friends?, released in June 1975. It reached number one on the Billboard R&B singles chart, peaked at number seven on the Hot 100 singles chart on November 29, 1975, number six in Canada (number 69 in the Canadian year-end chart), and number 12 in the UK. The song was also used in the Cheech & Chong movie Up in Smoke (1978), and appeared as track 3 of the associated original soundtrack album. It was later used in the Richard Linklater film Dazed and Confused (1993).

AllMusic says of the song: "the lyric takes the cool, laidback image of the lowrider— the Chicano culture practice of hydraulically hot-rodding classic cars— and using innuendo, extends the image to a lifestyle". A driving bassline by B. B. Dickerson is present almost throughout, along with an alto saxophone and harmonica riff by Charles Miller, who also provides lead vocals and a saxophone solo towards the end that includes a siren-like sound. Lee Oskar doubles the alto sax line on harmonica.

In 1987, "Low Rider" was remixed by Arthur Baker for inclusion on War's compilation album The Best of War ...and More in addition to the original version. This remix was released as a 7-inch single in the UK, where it charted at number 98 on the UK singles chart.

The hip-hop band Beastie Boys incorporate the hook of "Low Rider" on their song "Slow Ride", from their debut studio album Licensed to Ill (1986). Three years later, thrash metal band Exodus covered the song on their third studio album, Fabulous Disaster and, nearly a decade later, the song was covered by nu metal band Korn on their second studio album Life Is Peachy (1996). Beginning in 1996, "Low Rider" featured for several years on British television in adverts for Marmite, as part of their 'Love it or hate it' campaign. In 1999, Barry White recorded a cover version on his 20th and final studio album Staying Power. "Low Rider" was later used as the theme song for the George Lopez self-titled ABC sitcom, which ran from 2002 to 2007. The song was inducted into the Grammy Hall of Fame in 2014. In 2018, Dutch-Turkish EDM producer Ummet Ozcan made a remix of it. Canadian rapper bbno$ sampled "Low Rider" on his single, "Check" in 2025.

== Personnel ==
Personnel taken from Why Can't We Be Friends? liner notes, and Song Exploder.

- Charles Miller – vocals, alto saxophone
- Howard Scott – acoustic guitar
- B. B. Dickerson – bass guitar
- Lonnie Jordan – RMI piano, timbales, xylophone
- Harold Brown – drums
- Papa Dee Allen – cowbell
- Lee Oskar – harmonica

== Charts ==
Weekly chart performance for "Low Rider"
Chart (1975–1976)	Peak position
Canada Top Singles (RPM)	8
UK Singles (Official Charts)	12
US Billboard Hot 100	7
US Hot Soul Singles (Billboard)	1

== Certifications ==
Certifications and sales for "Low Rider"
Region	Certification	Certified units/sales
New Zealand (RMNZ)	Platinum	30,000^{‡}
United Kingdom (BPI)	Silver	200,000^{‡}
United States (RIAA)	Gold	500,000^{‡}
^{‡} Sales+streaming figures based on certification alone.
