= Mr. Bojangles (album) =

Studio album by Sonny Stitt
- Released: 1973
- Recorded: 1973
- Studios: Sound Exchange Studios, New York City, NY
- Genre: Jazz
- Length: 36:21
- Labels: Cadet; CA 50026
- Producer: Esmond Edwards

Sonny Stitt chronology
| 12! (1972) | Mr. Bojangles (1973) | God Bless Jug and Sonny (1973) |

Mr. Bojangles is an album by saxophonist Sonny Stitt recorded in 1973 and released on the Cadet label.

== Reception ==
Professional ratings
Review scores
| Source | Rating |
|---|---|
| Allmusic | 3.5/5 stars |

Allmusic awarded the album 3½ stars stating "Mr. Bojangles pairs Sonny Stitt with arranger Don Sebesky for one of the smoothest and most mainstream-facing dates of the saxophonist's career. Sebesky's luminous treatments underscore the elegance of Stitt's soulful alto and tenor leads".

== Track listing ==
1. "Mr. Bojangles" (Jerry Jeff Walker) - 7:31
2. "World Is a Ghetto" (Papa Dee Allen, Harold Brown, B.B. Dickerson, Lonnie Jordan, Charles Miller, Lee Oskar, Howard E. Scott) - 6:56
3. "Killing Me Softly With His Song" (Charles Fox, Norman Gimbel) - 4:41
4. "Blue Monsoon" (Esmond Edwards) - 5:06
5. "Got to Be There" (Elliot Willensky) - 3:33
6. "Fifty Per Cent" (Sonny Stitt) - 3:38
7. "Ben" (Donald Black, Walter Scharf) - 4:56

== Personnel ==
- Sonny Stitt - alto saxophone, tenor saxophone
- Roland Hanna - electric piano
- Cornell Dupree - guitar
- Richard Davis - electric bass
- Jimmy Johnson - drums
- George Marge - alto flute, oboe
- Jimmy Buffington - French Horn
- Gloria Agostini - harp
- Phil Kraus - vibraphone, xylophone, percussion
- Warren Smith - percussion
- David Nadien, Harold Kobain, Emmanuel Green, Gene Orloff, Paul Gershman, Harry Lookofsky, Joseph Malia - violin
- Charles McCracken, George Ricci cello
- Don Sebesky - arranger, conductor
