= All Day Music =

Studio album by War
- Released: November 1971
- Recorded: 1971
- Studio: Wally Heider's Studio 3 (San Francisco); Crystal (Los Angeles)
- Genre: Funk; progressive soul
- Length: 40:23
- Label: United Artists
- Producer: Jerry Goldstein, Chris Huston, War

War chronology
War (1971)	All Day Music (1971)	The World Is a Ghetto (1972)

Singles from All Day Music
- 1. "All Day Music" Released: July 1971; 2. "Slippin' Into Darkness" Released: November 1971

All Day Music is the fourth album by American band War, released November 1971 on United Artists Records.

== Release ==
The title single, issued in July 1971, was backed with "Get Down".

"Slipping Into Darkness", issued in November 1971 (backed with "Nappy Head"), War's first big hit since their name change from Eric Burdon and War, was on the Billboard Hot 100 for 22 weeks and so tied with Gallery's "Nice to Be With You" for most weeks on that chart all within the calendar year 1972. (The spelling was changed slightly to "Slippin' into Darkness" for the single, and is also used on a CD edition of the album.) It became a gold record, and Billboard ranked it as the No. 23 song for 1972. A subtitle for "Nappy Head" claims it is the theme from Ghetto Man, but there does not appear to be any notable film or television series with this title. "Baby Brother" is a live track recorded at the Hollywood Bowl, June 30, 1971, at an event called the United Artists 99 Cent Spectacular; a studio version of this song retitled "Me and Baby Brother" appeared on a later album, Deliver the Word (1973).

The original cover art was printed with a metallic silver background, and features a group photo by Bob Gordon.

== Critical reception ==
Professional ratings
Review scores
Source	Rating
AllMusic	4.5/5 stars
Christgau's Record Guide	B+

Village Voice critic Robert Christgau wrote: "I'm beginning to find that their slow groove has a winning depth of character—B.B. Dickerson and Papa Dee Allen get as personal on bass and congas as most rock and rollers do on guitar and piano, and their chants often say more than rock's so-called poetry. Nice to have a couple of hits for purposes of identification, too. But their very slow groove, the one that takes over side one with 'That's What Love Will Do,' makes me think they take the whole idea of Vanilla Fudge too seriously."

== Track listing ==
All tracks composed by War (Papa Dee Allen, Harold Brown, B.B. Dickerson, Lonnie Jordan, Charles Miller, Lee Oskar, Howard E. Scott), except where indicated.

Side one

1. "All Day Music" (Jerry Goldstein, War) – 4:04
2. "Get Down" (Goldstein, War) – 4:29
3. "That's What Love Will Do" (Milton James, War) – 7:17
4. "There Must Be a Reason" – 3:50

Side two

1. "Nappy Head (Theme from Ghetto Man)" – 6:05
2. "Slippin' into Darkness" – 7:00
3. "Baby Brother" – 7:38

== Personnel ==
War

- Howard Scott – guitar, percussion, vocals
- B.B. Dickerson – bass, percussion, vocals
- Lonnie Jordan – organ, piano, percussion, vocals
- Harold Brown – drums, percussion, vocals
- Papa Dee Allen – conga, bongos, percussion, vocals
- Charles Miller – flute, alto, tenor and baritone saxophones, percussion, vocals
- Lee Oskar – harmonica, percussion, vocals

Technical

- Jerry Goldstein, Chris Huston, War – producers
- Chris Huston, Richard Moore – engineers
