= Summer (War song) =

Single by War

from the album Greatest Hits
- B-side: "All Day Music"
- Released: June 21, 1976
- Genre: R&B
- Length: 3:58 (7" version) 6:40 (full version)
- Label: United Artists
- Composer: War
- Producer: Jerry Goldstein

War singles chronology
"Me and Baby Brother" (1976)	"Summer" (1976)	"L.A. Sunshine" (1977)

"Summer" is a song by the band War, recorded on April 4, 1976 and released on June 21, 1976, as a single from their Greatest Hits album in 1976. "Summer" peaked at number seven on the Billboard Hot 100 pop singles chart, hit number four on the R&B chart, and reached number one on the Easy Listening chart.

Lonnie Jordan recalls the jingle from Burger King at the time, "Have it your way", was so catchy that he "borrowed" it as the melody for the line, "'Cause it's summer..."

== Chart positions ==
Chart (1976)	Peak position
Canada RPM Top Singles	10
U.S. Billboard Hot 100	7
U.S. Billboard Easy Listening	1
U.S. Billboard Hot Soul Singles	4

== Certifications ==
Region	Certification	Certified units/sales
United States (RIAA)	Gold	1,000,000^{^}
^{^} Shipments figures based on certification alone.

== Christmas version ==
In 2023, War released a re-recorded version of “Summer”, entitled “Christmas”, with holiday-themed lyrics.

== See also ==
- List of number-one adult contemporary singles of 1976 (U.S.)
