= Gypsy Man (song) =

Single by War

from the album Deliver the Word
- B-side: "Deliver the Word"
- Released: July 1973
- Genre: Funk
- Length: 3:50 (US Promo Version); 5:22 (single version); 11:35 (album version)
- Label: United Artists
- Songwriter: War
- Producers: Howard E. Scott, Jerry Goldstein, Lonnie Jordan

War singles chronology
"The Cisco Kid" (1973)	"Gypsy Man" (1973)	"Me and Baby Brother" (1973)

"Gypsy Man" is a song written and performed by War. It was featured on their 1973 album Deliver the Word.

== Background ==
The song was produced by Howard E. Scott, Jerry Goldstein, and Lonnie Jordan. The album version, started off with a wind sound effect, before a longer instrumental section, sets up the vocal section. It also features more lyrical passages, ending with a longer coda in the harmonica, before the song's fade.

== Chart performance ==
It reached #6 on the U.S. R&B chart and #8 on the U.S. pop chart in 1973. The song ranked #93 on Billboard magazine's Top 100 singles of 1973. In Canada it reached #16.
