= Before the Rain =

Before the Rain may refer to:

- Before the Rain (1994 film), by Milčo Mančevski
- Before the Rain (2010 film), written by Shirley Barrett
- Before the Rain (Eternal album), 1997
- Before the Rain (Lee Oskar album), 1978
  - "Before the Rain", harmonica piece by Lee Oskar
- "Before the Rain", a 2010 song by Duran Duran from their album All You Need Is Now

== See also ==
- Before the Rains, a 2007 Indian-British film
