= The Cisco Kid (song) =

Single by War

from the album The World Is a Ghetto
- B-side: "Beetles in the Bog"
- Released: February 1973
- Genre: Funk rock; Latin; soul
- Length: 3:47 (Promo Version); 4:35 (Album/Single Version)
- Label: United Artists
- Songwriters: Thomas Allen; Harold Brown; Morris "BB" Dickerson; Charles Miller; Howard Scott; Lee Oskar; Lonnie Jordan
- Producer: Jerry Goldstein

War singles chronology
"The World Is a Ghetto" (1972)	"The Cisco Kid" (1973)	"Gypsy Man" (1973)

"The Cisco Kid" is a song performed by War, and written by Thomas Allen, Harold Brown, Morris "BB" Dickerson, Charles Miller, Howard Scott, Lee Oskar, and Lonnie Jordan, all members of War at the time. It is the first song on their 1972 album The World Is a Ghetto and is the group's highest-charting song on the Billboard Hot 100, peaking at number two.

== Song description ==
The song describes the adventures of Cisco and Pancho, two cowboys from the 1950s TV program The Cisco Kid. The song is known for having a different sequence of notes following each line. A distinct, four-note phrase played by saxophone, harmonica, and flute punctuates the end of the first few lines, while a brief jam from the rhythm section follows the next couple. A completely different four-note phrase (this time played by guitar) follows some of the later lyrics, as well as lines of dialogue from the television show—and the harmonica and saxophone repeat a three-note sequence twice in a row.

These easy-to-remember hooks, along with the funk-driven rhythm section, make this song one of War's signature tunes, and the "most fun", according to lead vocalist and guitarist Scott.

== Chart performance ==
In the US, "The Cisco Kid" reached number two on the Billboard Hot 100 for two weeks at the end of April and start of May 1973. On the US rhythm and blues singles chart, it peaked at number five. It reached number one in Canada on the RPM 100 singles chart. It was certified gold.

== Charts ==
Date	Chart (1973)	Peak position
May 19, 1973	Canada RPM Top Singles	1
April 28, 1973	US Billboard Hot 100	2
May 4, 1973	US Best Selling Soul Singles (Billboard)	5

== Certifications ==
Region	Certification	Certified units/sales
United States (RIAA)	Gold	1,000,000^{^}
^{^} Shipments figures based on certification alone.
