= War Live =

War Live may refer to:

- War Live (film), a 2000 Yugoslavian film
- War Live (album), a 1974 live album by War
