= Mr. Bojangles =

Mr. Bojangles may refer to:

- Bill Robinson (1877–1949), American dancer and actor, known as "Bojangles"
- "Mr. Bojangles" (song), a 1968 song by Jerry Jeff Walker
- "Mr. Bojangles", an unnamed suspect in the West Memphis Three murder case
- "Mr. Bojangles", a movement in Philip Glass's opera Einstein on the Beach
- Mr. Bojangles (album), a 1973 album by Sonny Stitt

== See also ==
- Bojangles (disambiguation)
