= Me and Baby Brother =

Single by War

from the album Deliver the Word
- B-side: "In Your Eyes"
- Released: August 1973
- Genre: Soul; funk
- Length: 3:30
- Label: United Artists
- Songwriter: War
- Producers: Howard E. Scott; Jerry Goldstein; Lonnie Jordan

War singles chronology
"Gypsy Man" (1973)	"Me and Baby Brother" (1973)	"Ballero" (1974)

"Me and Baby Brother" is a song written and performed by War. It reached #15 on the U.S. pop chart and #18 on the U.S. R&B chart in 1974. In Canada it reached #10. It was featured on their 1973 album Deliver the Word. A live version of the song entitled "Baby Brother" originally appeared on the 1971 album All Day Music.

The song was produced by Howard E. Scott, Jerry Goldstein, and Lonnie Jordan.

The song ranked #95 on Billboard magazine's Top 100 singles of 1974.

War re-released the song as a single in the UK in 1976 where it reached #21 on the UK Singles Chart.

== Other versions ==
- That Petrol Emotion released a live version of the song on their 1987 EP Live 33RPM.
- Stevie Salas released a version of the song on his 1998 album Cover Me in Noise.

== In popular culture ==
- The Killing Joke song "Change" bears a resemblance to "Me and Baby Brother", which Killing Joke have acknowledged.
- Sonic CD has a sample of this song that plays during "Stardust Speedway" in both good future and bad future versions of the track.
