= Slippin' into Darkness =

Single by War

from the album All Day Music
- B-side: Nappy Head (Theme From "Ghetto Man")
- Released: November 1971
- Genre: Funk; soul
- Length: 3:59 (single version); 6:59 (album version)
- Label: United Artists
- Songwriter: War
- Producer: Jerry Goldstein

War singles chronology
"All Day Music" (1971)	"Slippin' into Darkness" (1971)	"The World Is a Ghetto" (1972)

"Slippin' into Darkness" is a song written and performed in 1971 by War. The song was written by band members Charles Miller, Harold Brown, Howard Scott, Lee Oskar, Lonnie Jordan, and Papa Dee Allen and produced by Jerry Goldstein. A live version of the song was featured as the B-side to their 1974 single "Ballero".

== Background ==
This song is an unusual blues form with the first lines being repeated in an African and Latin rhythm. The song is from the perspective of someone whose friend's life was taken away, who withdraws from reality, having to pay the consequences. Because of the song's length in the album version, at 6:59, the single radio edit version of 3:59 omits the slower introduction plus the second verse of the song.

== Chart performance ==
It reached #12 on the U.S. R&B chart and #16 on the U.S. pop chart in 1972, logging 22 weeks on that chart, tied for most total weeks inside that year with Gallery's "Nice to Be with You". It was featured on their 1971 album All Day Music. The song ranked #23 on Billboard magazine's Top 100 singles of 1972. In Canada, it reached #13.

== Other versions ==
- The Nigerian funk combo The Funkees recorded a version in 1973.
- Mr G. And The Dayton Sidewinders released a version on Carlco Records (1974).
- Tony Sherman released a version as the B side of the 45 single of "Tonight" (1974).
- Cargo Cult released a version of the song on their 1986 album Strange Men Bearing Gifts.
- Black Uhuru released a version of the song on their 1992 album Mystical Truth.
- Pucho & His Latin Soul Brothers released a version of the song on their 1995 album Rip a Dip.
- Sandra St. Victor released a version of the song on her 2001 album Gemini: Both Sides.
- Ramsey Lewis and Nancy Wilson released a version of the song on their 2003 album Simple Pleasures.
- Widespread Panic released a version of the song on their 2004 live album Jackassolantern.
- Lettuce released a version of the song on their 2012 album Fly.
- Marcus Miller released a version of the song on his 2012 album Renaissance.

== Sampling ==
- War's version was sampled in the 1988 songs "Guitar Playin'" and "Payback's a Mutha" by King T on his album Act a Fool.
- War's version was sampled in the 1989 song "You Got Larceny" by 2 Live Crew on their album As Clean As They Wanna Be.
- War's version was sampled in the 1990 song "Rock Dis Funky Joint" by Poor Righteous Teachers on their album Holy Intellect.
- War's version was sampled in the 1994 song "Lil Knucklehead" by South Central Cartel on their album 'N Gatz We Truss.
- War's version was sampled in the 1996 song "Sippin' On A 40" by Eazy-E on his album Str8 off tha Streetz of Muthaphukkin Compton.
- War's version was sampled in the 1997 song "Capítulo 4, Versículo 3" by Racionais MC's on their album Sobrevivendo no Inferno.
- War's version was sampled in the 1999 song "I'm Good at Being Bad" by TLC on their album FanMail.
- War's musical hook was used as the basis for the 1974 song "Get Up, Stand Up" by Bob Marley
- War's version was sampled in the 2025 song "The Largest" by BigXthaPlug for his album Take Care (BigXthaPlug album)

== In popular culture ==
- War's version was featured in the fifth episode of 2016 season of The Get Down.
- War's version was featured on the soundtrack of the 2016 film Suicide Squad.
- War's version was featured on the soundtrack of the 1992 film American Me.
- War's version was featured on the last season of the TV show Snowfall.
- War's version was featured in the fourth episode (season 1) of the series Duster on HBO Max.

== Certifications ==
Region	Certification	Certified units/sales
United States (RIAA)	Platinum	2,000,000^{^}
^{^} Shipments figures based on certification alone.
