= New Orleans soul =

Subgenre of soul music

- Stylistic origins: Gospel music; Southern soul; boogie-woogie; pop music; jazz; Latin music; rock music
- Cultural origins: Early 1960s; New Orleans, Louisiana (United States)
- Derivative forms: Funk

Other topics
- Allen Toussaint; Mahalia Jackson

New Orleans soul is a subgenre of soul music that originated in the early 1960s in the New Orleans area. It has its roots primarily in gospel and pop music, while also including rhythmic patterns influenced by boogie-woogie and incorporating rock rhythms influenced by the popular "second line" beats typical in the city. The influence of Caribbean and Latin music from the 1960s was significant, inspiring the development of more exotic rhythms within this soul genre, although mid-tempo rhythms also exist. Musicians often prioritized melody and tone over lyrical content.

== Origins ==
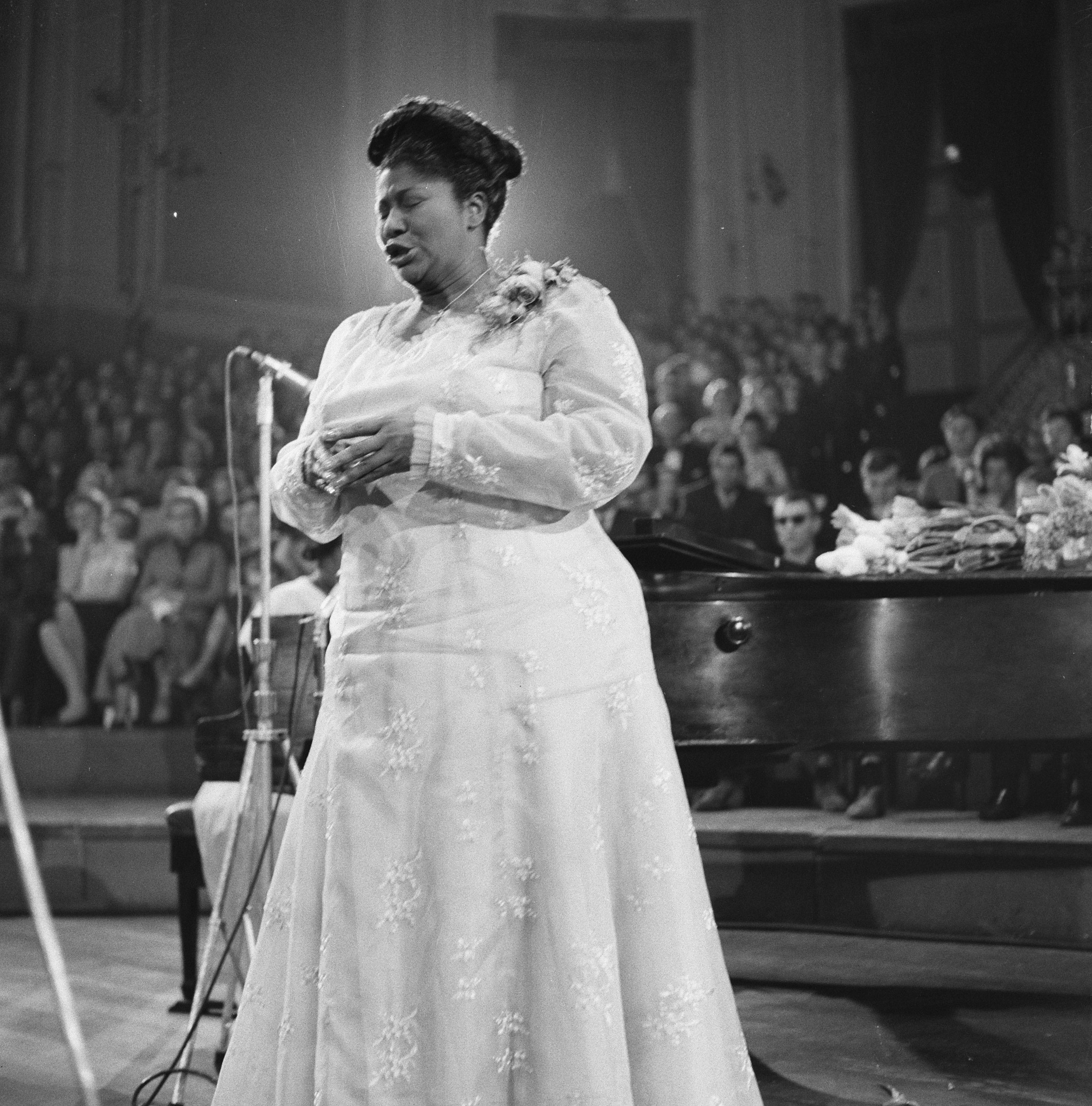
Photo of Mahalia Jackson performing at a concert in 1961.

The initial songs in this soul style emerged from the talents of songwriter and producer Allen Toussaint in 1960. Subsequently, this musical style gained significant traction among other local and regional artists. By the 1990s, New Orleans Soul had captured the interest of many singers from various soul music genres. Originally cultivated in New Orleans, its influence remained relatively contained within the city boundaries. However, some musicians from Memphis acknowledged the genre as a significant influence on the development of their own style of soul. Moreover, it left an imprint on Northern Soul and British soul. Around 1965, Toussaint, a pivotal figure in this genre, produced a slower variation that played a crucial role in the birth of funk.

== Notable artists ==
- Irma Thomas
- Dr. John
- Harry Connick, Jr.
- Dave Bartholomew and Fats Domino
- Walter "Wolfman" Washington
- Jessie Hill
- Mahalia Jackson
