= Lowrider Band =

US musical group

- Years active: 1990s–present
- Members: Howard E. Scott; Lee Oskar; Harold Brown
- Past members: B.B. Dickerson (died 2021)
- Website: lowriderband.com

The Lowrider Band consists of three of the four surviving original core group members of the multi-platinum selling band War: Howard E. Scott, Lee Oskar, and Harold Brown.

== Background ==
The four original members lost the right in federal court to use and tour under the name "War" in the mid-1990s to Far Out Productions (producer and manager Jerry Goldstein). The band's original keyboardist Lonnie Jordan now tours using the name "War" under Goldstein's guidance.

== Career ==
In 2008, the band did a one-off performance in Houston with special guest Alice Tweed Smith.

In 2009, the group performed in New Orleans at a benefit for the Save Charity Hospital organization.

The band was booked to play at the Starlight Bowl, 1249 Lockheed View Drive, Burbank on Saturday, 25 July, 2015 at 6:30 p.m.

The band was booked to play at the fifth annual New Blues Festival on Saturday of the 2018 Labor Day weekend. The event was in conjunction with the Long Beach Blues Society. The line up for the event was, Howard Scott on guitar, Harold Brown on drums, BB Dickerson on bass, Lance Ellis on saxophone and flute, Pete Cole on keyboards, Chuck Barber on percussion and Tex Nakamura on harmonica. For that particular show, Tex Nakamura who had played with War for fifteen years, was filling in for Lee Oskar.

== Band members ==
=== Current lineup ===
- Howard E. Scott - guitars, vocals
- Lee Oskar - harmonica
- Harold Brown - drums, vocals
- Lance Ellis - saxophone
- Chuk Barber - percussion, vocals
- Pete Cole - keyboards, vocals
- Don Rousell - bass, vocals

=== Former members ===
- B.B. Dickerson - bass, vocals (died 2021)

== Discography ==
=== Singles ===
- "La Playa" - Nuqik – LMS 0422 - 2014

=== Albums ===
- Lowrider Band - Lee Oscar Productions - ????
- The Original Lowriders - Lee Oscar Productions - 2003
