= The World Is a Ghetto (War song) =

Single by War

from the album The World Is a Ghetto
- B-side: "Four Cornered Room"
- Released: October 1972
- Genre: Psychedelic soul
- Length: 3:59 (single version); 10:10 (album version)
- Label: United Artists
- Songwriter: War
- Producer: Jerry Goldstein

War singles chronology
"Slippin' into Darkness" (1971)	"The World Is a Ghetto" (1972)	"The Cisco Kid" (1973)

"The World Is a Ghetto" is a song written and performed by War. The song was produced by Jerry Goldstein, and was featured on the band's album of the same name.

== Background ==
The single version radio edit is less than 4 minutes. The album version, over 10 minutes long, features a third verse, a longer intro, a saxophone solo in the instrumental section, and an extended coda featuring an electric guitar solo while War repeatedly sings the song's title before the fade.

== Chart performance ==
It reached #3 on the U.S. R&B chart and #7 on the U.S. pop chart in 1973. It reached #39 in Canada. The song ranked #94 on Billboard magazine's Top 100 singles of 1973.

== Certifications ==
Region	Certification	Certified units/sales
United States (RIAA)	Gold	1,000,000^{^}
^{^} Shipments figures based on certification alone.

== Other charting versions ==
- Will Downing released a version of the song as a single in 1991 which reached #83 on the UK Singles Chart.

== Other versions ==
- Ahmad Jamal released a version of the song as a single in 1973.
- Charles Kynard released a version of the song on his 1973 album Your Mama Don't Dance.
- James Moody released a version of the song on his 1973 album Sax & Flute Man.
- Sonny Stitt released a version of the song on his 1973 album Mr. Bojangles.
- George Shearing released a version of the song on his 1974 album The Way We Are.
- George Benson released a version of the song as a single in 1977.
- The Sax Pack released a version of the song on their 2008 album The Sax Pack.
- DJ Spinna released a version of the song on his 2009 compilation album The Boogie Back: Post Disco Club Jams.
- The Paragons released a version of the song on their 2015 re-release of the album On the Beach with The Paragons.
- Kandace Springs released a version of the song on her 2016 album Soul Eyes.
- In 2021, Los Lobos covered the song on their tribute to Los Angeles: Native Sons.
- Billy Valentine released a version of the song on his 2023 album Billy Valentine & The Universal Truth.

== Sampling ==
- War's version was sampled in the 1996 song "The World Is a Ghetto" by Geto Boys on their album The Resurrection.
- ASAP Mob, ASAP Nast and Method Man sampled the song of their 2013 single, Trillmatic.
- George Benson's version was sampled by Thomas Bangalter of Daft Punk for his 1996 single "Spinal Scratch".
