= Bojangles =

Bojangles may refer to:

== People nicknamed "Bojangles" ==
- Bill Robinson (1877–1949), American dancer and actor
- Ron Atkinson (born 1939), former British football player and manager

== Media ==
- Bojangles (film), a 2001 TV-movie about Robinson and starring Gregory Hines
- "Bojangles" (song), by rapper Pitbull

== Other uses ==
- Bojangles (restaurant), a fast-food restaurant chain
- Bojangles Coliseum, an arena in Charlotte, North Carolina

== See also ==
- "Bojangles of Harlem", a 1936 song from the Fred Astaire movie Swing Time
- Mr. Bojangles (disambiguation)
