= List of Billboard number-one R&B albums of 1973 =

These are the Billboard magazine R&B albums that reached number-one in 1973.

== Chart history ==
Issue date	Album	Artist
January 6	360 Degrees of Billy Paul	Billy Paul
January 13	360 Degrees of Billy Paul	Billy Paul
January 20	Talking Book	Stevie Wonder
January 27	Talking Book	Stevie Wonder
February 3	Talking Book	Stevie Wonder
February 10	The World Is a Ghetto	War
February 17	The World Is a Ghetto	War
February 24	The World Is a Ghetto	War
March 3	The World Is a Ghetto	War
March 10	The World Is a Ghetto	War
March 17	The World Is a Ghetto	War
March 24	The World Is a Ghetto	War
March 31	Wattstax: The Living Word	Various artists / Soundtrack
April 7	Wattstax: The Living Word	Various artists / Soundtrack
April 14	Neither One of Us	Gladys Knight & the Pips
April 21	Neither One of Us	Gladys Knight & the Pips
April 28	Masterpiece	The Temptations
May 5	Masterpiece	The Temptations
May 12	Spinners	The Spinners
May 19	Spinners	The Spinners
May 26	Spinners	The Spinners
June 2	Birth Day	New Birth
June 9	Call Me	Al Green
June 16	Call Me	Al Green
June 23	Live at the Sahara Tahoe	Isaac Hayes
June 30	Live at the Sahara Tahoe	Isaac Hayes
July 7	I've Got So Much to Give	Barry White
July 14	I've Got So Much to Give	Barry White
July 21	Back to the World	Curtis Mayfield
July 28	Back to the World	Curtis Mayfield
August 4	Fresh	Sly and the Family Stone
August 11	Fresh	Sly and the Family Stone
August 18	Fresh	Sly and the Family Stone
August 25	Touch Me in the Morning	Diana Ross
September 1	Touch Me in the Morning	Diana Ross
September 8	Innervisions	Stevie Wonder
September 15	Innervisions	Stevie Wonder
September 22	Deliver the Word	War
September 29	Let's Get It On	Marvin Gaye
October 6	Let's Get It On	Marvin Gaye
October 13	Let's Get It On	Marvin Gaye
October 20	Let's Get It On	Marvin Gaye
October 27	Let's Get It On	Marvin Gaye
November 3	Let's Get It On	Marvin Gaye
November 10	Let's Get It On	Marvin Gaye
November 17	Let's Get It On	Marvin Gaye
November 24	Let's Get It On	Marvin Gaye
December 1	Let's Get It On	Marvin Gaye
December 8	Let's Get It On	Marvin Gaye
December 15	Imagination	Gladys Knight & the Pips
December 22	Imagination	Gladys Knight & the Pips
December 29	Imagination	Gladys Knight & the Pips

== See also ==
- 1973 in music
- R&B number-one hits of 1973 (USA)
