= Before the Rain (Lee Oskar album) =

Cruisin'

Studio album by Lee Oskar
- Released: 1978
- Studios: The Record Plant (L.A. and Sausalito), Wally Heider Studios, Clover Recorders
- Genres: R&B, jazz
- Length: 43:35
- Labels: Elektra, Avenue
- Producer: Greg Errico

Singles from Before the Rain
- 1. "Before the Rain"; 2. "Steppin'"; 3. "San Francisco Bay"; 4. "Feeling' Happy"; 5. "More Than Word Can Say"; 6. "Sing Song"; 7. "Haunted House"

Before the Rain is the second studio album by the Danish harmonica player Lee Oskar, released on 1978 by Elektra Records. It was reissued in 1995 by Avenue Records.

== Critical reception ==
Professional ratings
Review scores
Source	Rating
AllMusic	3/5 stars

Linda Hamilton of Deseret News praised Oskar's performances, noting that it had "retained much of War's sound". SleepyJack praised the album's sound design, stating that it was "straight-forward and stripped-down" and "put the harmonica in a role typically reserved for sax sounded fresh. A reviewer for In Sheep's Clothing praised the album, which they said was a "roller disco classic", also nothing that it was "a pleasant harmonica funk album with one incredible haunted tune." Alex Henderson of AllMusic praised Oskar's harmonica playing, stating it was "expressive whether he is getting mildly funky on "Steppin'" or being mellow and laid-back on "More Than Words Can Say"."

== Charts ==
=== Weekly charts ===
Chart (1978)	Peak position
US Billboard R&B	97

=== Year-end charts ===
Chart (1979)	Position
US Billboard Jazz	32
