= Soul music =

Genre of music

Soul
- Stylistic origins: Rhythm and blues; gospel
- Cultural origins: Late 1950s – early 1960s, U.S.
- Derivative forms: Funk; contemporary R&B; hip-hop; disco; post-disco

Subgenres
- Cinematic soul; Latin soul; Motown sound; neo soul; retro-soul; quiet storm

Fusion genres
- Hip-hop soul; nu jazz; pop soul; psychedelic soul; progressive soul; soul blues; soul jazz; smooth soul; swamp rock

Regional scenes
- United Kingdom; United States

Local scenes
- Chicago; Detroit; Memphis; New York City; New Orleans; Northern England; Philadelphia; Southern United States; West Coast

Other topics
- Blue-eyed soul; brown-eyed soul; Minneapolis sound; new jack swing; rare groove; slow jam; urban contemporary music; List of soul musicians; African-American music

Soul music is a popular music genre that originated in African-American communities throughout the United States in the late 1950s and early 1960s. Catchy rhythms, stressed by handclaps and extemporaneous body movements, are an important hallmark of soul. Other characteristics are a call and response between the lead and backing vocalists, an especially tense vocal sound, and occasional improvisational additions, twirls, and auxiliary sounds. Soul music is known for reflecting African-American identity and stressing the importance of African-American culture.

Soul emerged during the late 1950s, with its roots in African-American gospel music and rhythm and blues, and primarily combines elements of gospel, R&B and jazz. It subsequently became associated with the civil rights movement, serving as an expression of black cultural identity, pride and political consciousness. Soul music became popular for dancing and listening, and American record labels such as Motown, Atlantic and Stax were influential in its proliferation during the civil rights movement. Soul also became popular worldwide, directly influencing rock music and the music of Africa. It had a resurgence in the mid-to late 1990s with the subgenre neo soul, which incorporated modern production elements and hip-hop influences.

Soul music dominated the U.S. R&B charts in the 1960s, and many recordings crossed over into the pop charts in the United States, United Kingdom, and elsewhere. Many prominent soul artists, including Ray Charles, Sam Cooke, Otis Redding, James Brown, Aretha Franklin, and various acts under the Motown label, such as the Supremes and the Temptations, were highly influential in the genre's development and all gained widespread popularity during this time. By 1968, the soul music genre had begun to splinter. Some soul artists moved to funk music, while other singers and groups developed slicker, more sophisticated, and in some cases more socially conscious varieties. By the early 1970s, soul music had begun to absorb influences from psychedelic rock and progressive rock, among other genres, leading to the creation of psychedelic soul and progressive soul. Prominent soul artists of this era include Marvin Gaye, Jackson 5, Stevie Wonder, Curtis Mayfield, Isaac Hayes, Al Green, and Bill Withers. Neo soul, which adopted hip-hop influences, developed around 1994.

Other subgenres of soul include the "Motown sound", a more rhythmic and pop-friendly style that originated from the eponymous label; Southern soul, a driving, energetic variety combining R&B with southern gospel music influences; Memphis soul, a shimmering, sultry style; New Orleans soul, which emerged from the rhythm and blues style; Chicago soul, a lighter gospel-influenced sound; and Philadelphia soul, a lush orchestral variety with doo-wop-inspired vocals.

== History ==
=== Origins ===
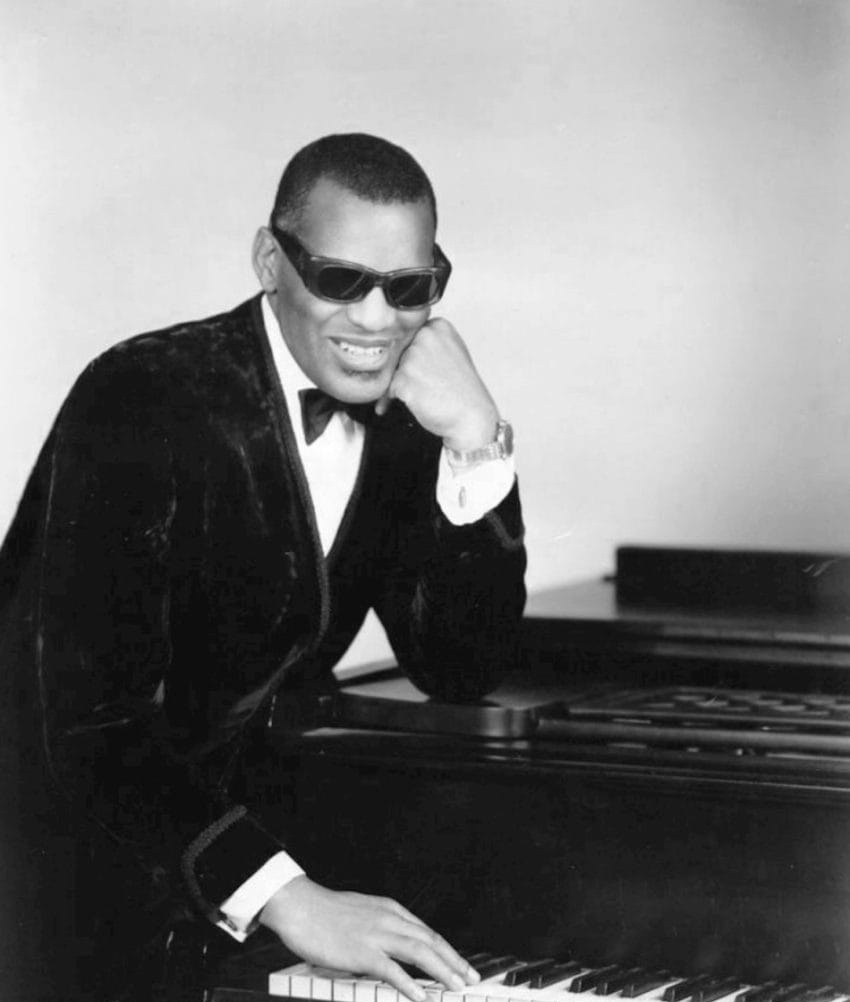
Ray Charles pioneered the soul music genre during the 1950s by combining blues, rhythm and blues, and gospel styles.

Soul music has its roots in traditional African-American gospel music and rhythm and blues and as the hybridization of their respective religious and secular styles – in both lyrical content and instrumentation – that began in the 1950s. The term "soul" had been used among African-American musicians to emphasize the feeling of being an African American in the United States. According to musicologist Barry Hansen,

Though this hybrid produced a clutch of hits in the R&B market in the early 1950s, only the most adventurous white fans felt its impact at the time; the rest had to wait for the coming of soul music in the 1960s to feel the rush of rock and roll sung gospel-style.

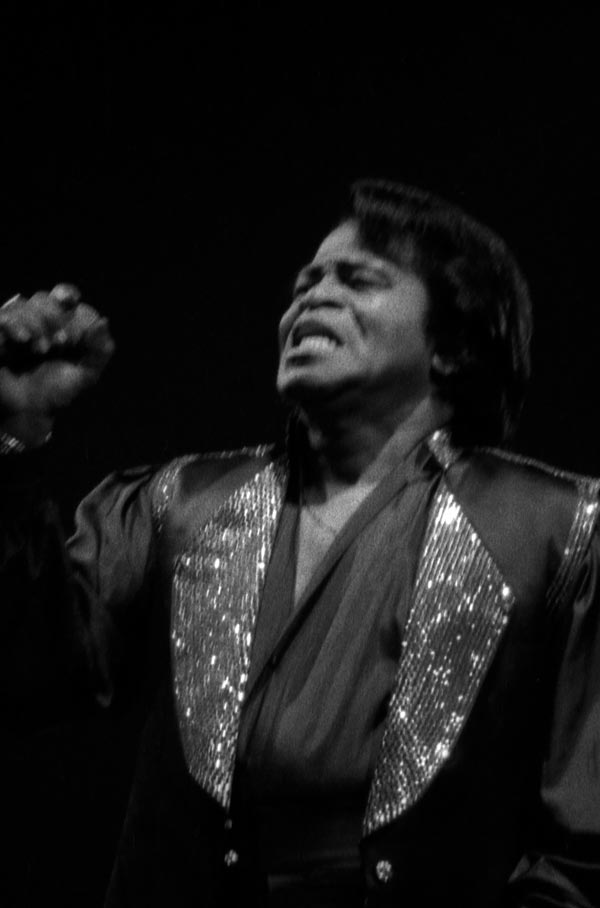
James Brown was known as the "Godfather of Soul".

According to AllMusic, "Soul music was the result of the urbanization and commercialization of rhythm and blues in the '60s." However, the word “soul” was already being used in jazz discourse by the mid-1950s to describe gospel- and blues-influenced playing. The related term “soul jazz” emerged in the mid- to late 1950s as a description of gospel-influenced hard bop. The phrase “soul music,” referring specifically to gospel-style music with secular lyrics, was first attested in 1961. The term "soul" in African-American parlance has connotations of African-American pride and culture. Gospel groups in the 1940s and 1950s occasionally used the term as part of their names. Soul jazz developed from hard bop and rhythm and blues, incorporating strong influences from African-American gospel music. As singers and arrangers began using techniques from both gospel and this jazz style in African-American popular music during the 1960s, soul music gradually functioned as an umbrella term for African-American popular music at the time.

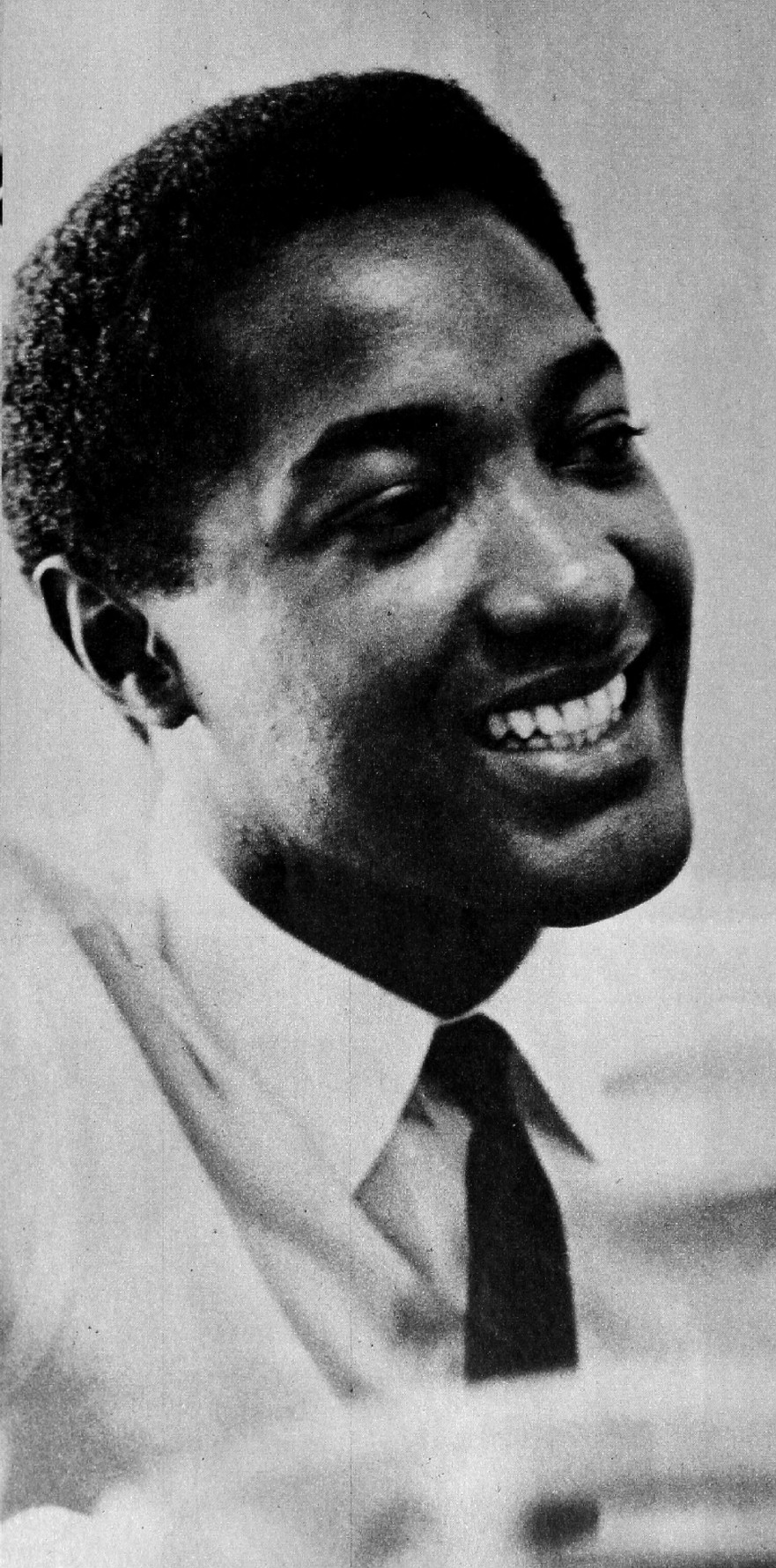
Sam Cooke is regarded as one of soul music's "forefathers".

According to the Acoustic Music Organization, the "first clear evidence of soul music shows up with the "5" Royales, an ex-gospel group that turned to R&B and in Faye Adams, whose "Shake A Hand" becomes an R&B standard".

Important innovators whose recordings in the 1950s contributed to the emergence of soul music included Clyde McPhatter, Hank Ballard, and Etta James. Ray Charles is often cited as popularizing the soul music genre with his series of hits, starting with 1954's "I Got a Woman". Singer Bobby Womack said, "Ray was the genius. He turned the world onto soul music." Charles was open in acknowledging the influence of Pilgrim Travelers vocalist Jesse Whitaker on his singing style.

Little Richard, who inspired Otis Redding, and James Brown both were equally influential. Brown was nicknamed the "Godfather of Soul Music", and Richard proclaimed himself as the "King of Rockin' and Rollin', Rhythm and Blues Soulin'", because his music embodied elements of all three, and since he inspired artists in all three genres.

Sam Cooke and Jackie Wilson also are often acknowledged as soul forefathers. Cooke became popular as the lead singer of the gospel group the Soul Stirrers, before controversially moving into secular music. His recording of "You Send Me" in 1957 launched a successful pop music career. Furthermore, his 1962 recording of "Bring It On Home to Me" has been described as "perhaps the first record to define the soul experience". Jackie Wilson, a contemporary of both Cooke and James Brown, also achieved crossover success, especially with his 1957 hit "Reet Petite". He even was particularly influential for his dramatic delivery and performances.

=== 1960s ===
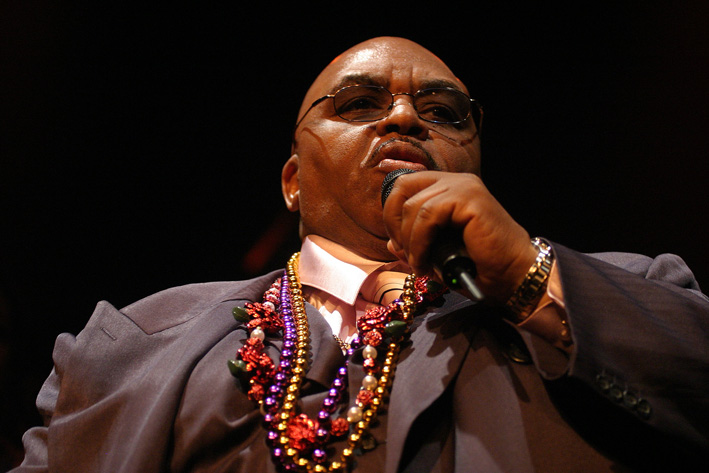
Solomon Burke recorded for Atlantic Records in the 1960s.

Husband-wife duo Ike & Tina Turner emerged as "leading exponents" of soul music in the 1960s. Their debut single "A Fool in Love" crossed over to the pop charts in 1960. They earned a Grammy nomination for their song "It's Gonna Work Out Fine" in 1962. Along with the Kings of Rhythm and the Ikettes, they toured the Chitlin' Circuit as the Ike & Tina Turner Revue.

Writer Peter Guralnick is among those to identify Solomon Burke as a key figure in the emergence of soul music, and Atlantic Records as the key record label. Burke's early 1960s songs, including "Cry to Me", "Just Out of Reach (of My Two Open Arms)" and "Down in the Valley" are considered classics of the genre. Guralnick wrote:

Soul started, in a sense, with the 1961 success of Solomon Burke's "Just Out of Reach". Ray Charles, of course, had already enjoyed enormous success (also on Atlantic), as had James Brown and Sam Cooke—primarily in a pop vein. Each of these singers, though, could be looked upon as an isolated phenomenon; it was only with the coming together of Burke and Atlantic Records that you could begin to see anything even resembling a movement.

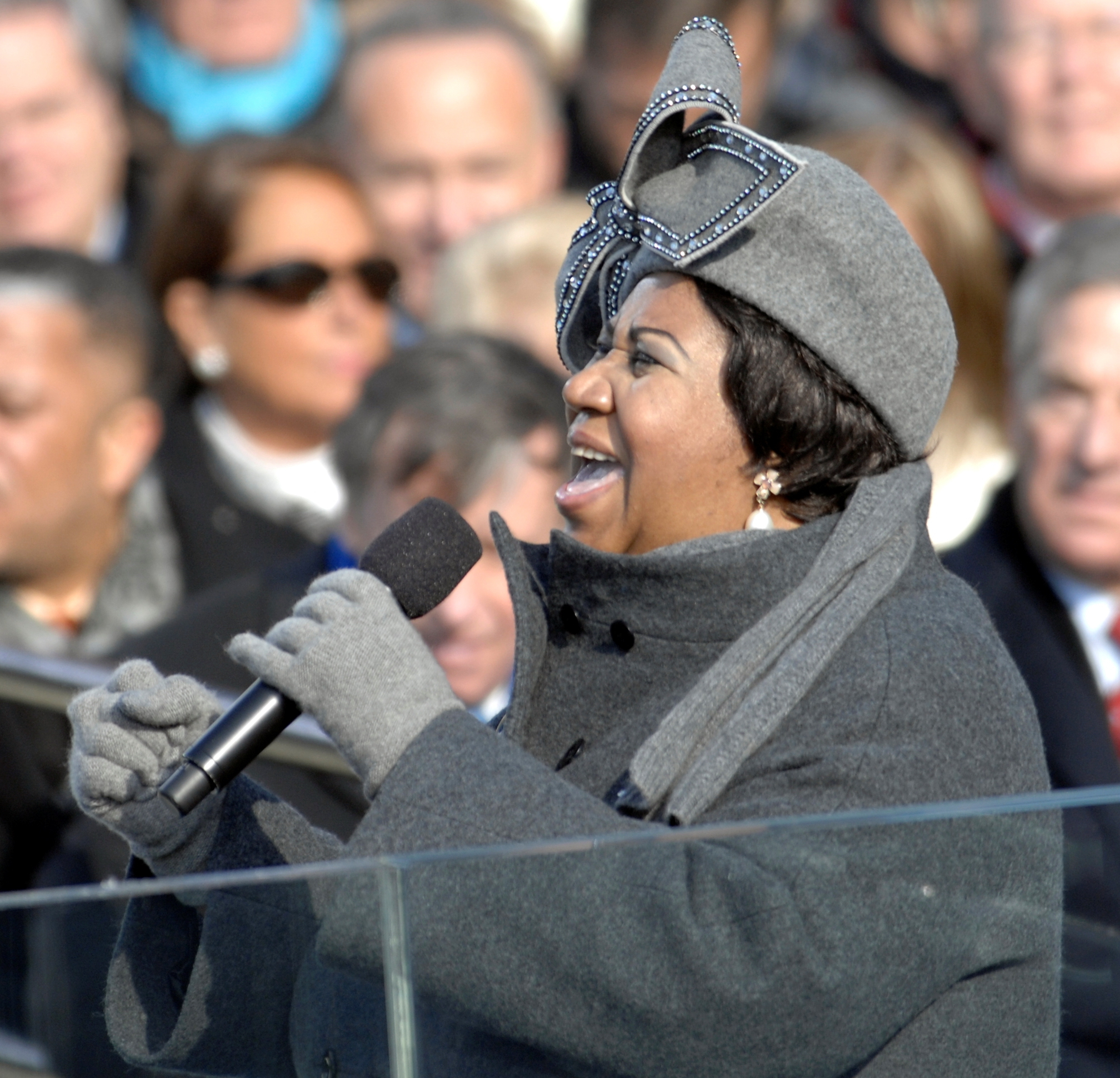
Aretha Franklin is widely known as the "Queen of Soul".

Ben E. King also achieved success in 1961 with "Stand by Me", a song directly based on a gospel hymn. By the mid-1960s, the initial successes of Burke, King, and others had been surpassed by new soul singers, including Stax artists such as Otis Redding and Wilson Pickett, who mainly recorded in Memphis, Tennessee, and Muscle Shoals, Alabama. According to Jon Landau:

Between 1962 and 1964 Redding recorded a series of soul ballads characterized by unabashedly sentimental lyrics usually begging forgiveness or asking a girlfriend to come home... He soon became known as "Mr. Pitiful" and earned a reputation as the leading performer of soul ballads.

The most important female soul singer to emerge was Aretha Franklin, originally a gospel singer who began to make secular recordings in 1960 but whose career was later revitalized by her recordings for Atlantic. Her 1967 recordings, such as "I Never Loved a Man (The Way I Love You)", "Respect" (written and originally recorded by Otis Redding), and "Do Right Woman, Do Right Man" (written by Chips Moman and Dan Penn), were significant and commercially successful recordings.

Soul music dominated the U.S. African-American music charts in the 1960s, and many recordings crossed over into the pop charts in the U.S. Otis Redding was a huge success at the Monterey International Pop Festival in 1967. The genre also became highly popular in the UK, where many leading acts toured in the late 1960s. "Soul" became an umbrella term for an increasingly wide variety of R&B-based music styles – from the dance and pop-oriented acts at Motown Records in Detroit, such as the Temptations, Marvin Gaye and Stevie Wonder, to "deep soul" performers such as Percy Sledge and James Carr. Different regions and cities within the U.S., including New York City, Detroit, Chicago, Memphis, New Orleans, Philadelphia, and Muscle Shoals, Alabama (the home of FAME Studios and Muscle Shoals Sound Studios) became noted for different subgenres of the music and recording styles.

By 1968, while at its peak of popularity, soul began to fragment into different subgenres. Artists such as James Brown and Sly and the Family Stone evolved into funk music, while other singers such as Marvin Gaye, Stevie Wonder, Curtis Mayfield and Al Green developed slicker, more sophisticated and in some cases more politically conscious varieties of the genre. However, soul music continued to evolve, informing most subsequent forms of R&B from the 1970s-onward, with pockets of musicians continuing to perform in traditional soul style.

=== 1970s and 1980s ===
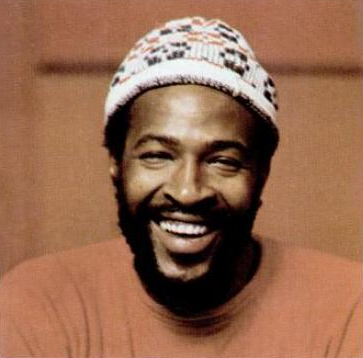
Marvin Gaye shifted to a socially conscious sound with his 1971 hit "What's Going On".

Mitchell's Hi Records continued in the Stax tradition of the previous decade, releasing a string of hits by Green, Ann Peebles, Otis Clay, O. V. Wright and Syl Johnson. Bobby Womack, who recorded with Chips Moman in the late 1960s, continued to produce soul recordings in the 1970s and 1980s.

In Detroit, producer Don Davis worked with Stax artists such as Johnnie Taylor and the Dramatics. Early 1970s recordings by the Detroit Emeralds, such as Do Me Right, are a link between soul and the later disco style. Motown Records artists such as Marvin Gaye, Michael Jackson, Stevie Wonder and Smokey Robinson contributed to the evolution of soul music, although their recordings were considered more in a pop music vein than those of Redding, Franklin and Carr. Although stylistically different from classic soul music, recordings by Chicago-based artists are often considered part of the genre.

By the early 1970s, soul music had been influenced by psychedelic rock and other genres. Artists like James Brown led soul towards funk music, which became typified by 1970s bands like Parliament-Funkadelic and the Meters. More versatile groups such as War, the Commodores, and Earth, Wind and Fire became popular around this time. During the 1970s, some slick and commercial blue-eyed soul acts like Philadelphia's Hall & Oates and Oakland's Tower of Power achieved mainstream success, as did a new generation of street-corner harmony or "city-soul" groups such as the Delfonics and the historically black Howard University's Unifics.

The syndicated music/dance variety television series Soul Train, hosted by Chicago native Don Cornelius, debuted in 1971. The show provided an outlet for soul music for several decades, also spawning a franchise that saw the creation of a record label (Soul Train Records) that distributed music by the Whispers, Carrie Lucas, and an up-and-coming group known as Shalamar. Numerous disputes led to Cornelius spinning off the record label to his talent booker, Dick Griffey, who transformed the label into Solar Records, itself a prominent soul music label throughout the 1980s. The TV series continued to air until 2006, although other predominantly African-American music genres such as hip-hop began overshadowing soul on the show beginning in the 1980s.

=== Beyond ===
As disco and funk musicians had hits in the late 1970s and early 1980s, soul went in the direction of quiet storm. With its relaxed tempos and soft melodies, quiet storm soul took influences from fusion and adult contemporary. Some funk bands, such as EW&F, the Commodores and Con Funk Shun would have a few quiet storm tracks on their albums. Among the most successful acts in this era include Smokey Robinson, Jeffry Osbourne, Peabo Bryson, Chaka Khan, and Larry Graham.

After the decline of disco and funk in the early 1980s, soul music became influenced by electro music. It became less raw and more slickly produced, resulting in a style that is known as contemporary R&B, which sounded very different from the original rhythm and blues style. The United States saw the development of neo-soul around 1994.

== Notable labels and producers ==
=== Motown Records ===
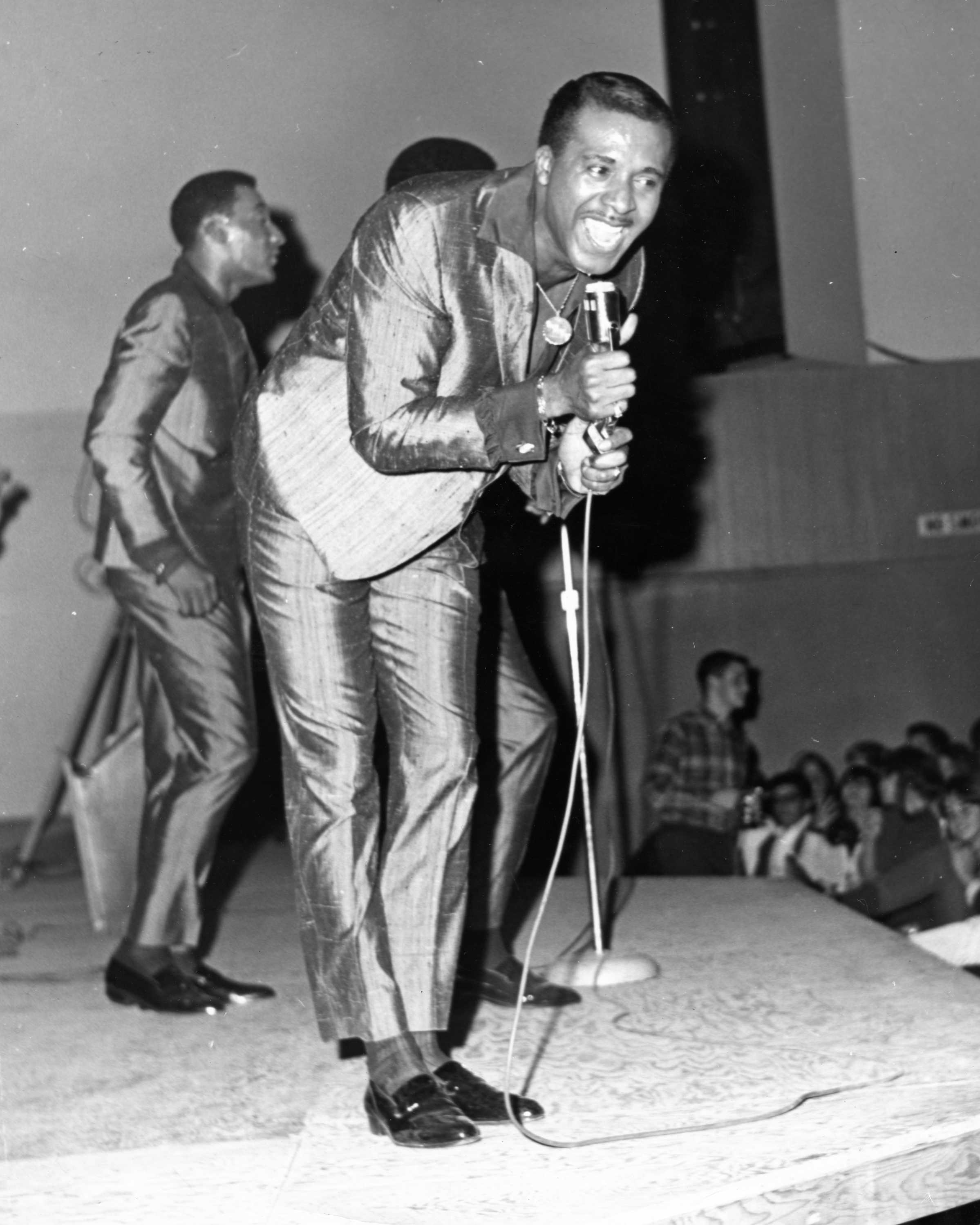
Levi Stubbs singing lead with the Four Tops in 1966.

Berry Gordy's successful Tamla/Motown group of labels was notable for being African American owned, unlike most of the earlier independent R&B labels. Notable artists under this label were Gladys Knight & the Pips, the Supremes, the Temptations, the Miracles, the Four Tops, the Marvelettes, Mary Wells, Jr. Walker & the All-Stars, Stevie Wonder, Marvin Gaye, Tammi Terrell, Martha and the Vandellas, and the Jackson 5.

Hits were made using a quasi-industrial "assembly line" approach. The producers and songwriters brought artistic sensitivity to the three-minute tunes. Brian Holland, Lamont Dozier and Eddie Holland were rarely out of the charts for their work as songwriters and record producers for the Supremes, the Four Tops and Martha and the Vandellas. They allowed important elements to shine through the dense musical texture. The rhythm was emphasized by handclaps or tambourine. Smokey Robinson was another writer and record producer who added lyrics to "The Tracks of My Tears" by his group the Miracles, which was one of the most important songs of the decade.

=== Stax Records and Atlantic Records ===
Stax Records and Atlantic Records were independent labels that produced high-quality dance records featuring many well-known singers of the day. They tended to have smaller ensembles marked by expressive gospel-tinged vocals. Brass and saxophones were also used extensively. Stax Records, founded by siblings Estelle and James Stewart, was the second most successful record label behind Motown Records. They were responsible for releasing hits by Otis Redding, Wilson Pickett, the Staple Singers, and many more. Ahmet Ertegun, who had anticipated being a diplomat until 1944 when his father died, founded Atlantic Records in 1947 with his friend Herb Abramson. Ertegun wrote many songs for Ray Charles and the Clovers. He even sang backup vocals for his artist Big Joe Turner on the song "Shake, Rattle and Roll".

== Subgenres ==
=== Detroit (Motown) ===
Dominated by Berry Gordy's Motown Records empire, Detroit's soul is strongly rhythmic and influenced by gospel music. The Motown sound often includes hand clapping, a powerful bassline, strings, brass and vibraphone. Motown Records' house band was the Funk Brothers. AllMusic cites Motown as the pioneering label of pop-soul, a style of soul music with raw vocals, but polished production and toned-down subject matter intended for pop radio and crossover success. Artists of this style included Diana Ross, the Jackson 5, Stevie Wonder, and Billy Preston. Popular during the 1960s, the style became glossier during the 1970s and led to disco. In the late 2000s, the style was revisited by contemporary soul singers such as Amy Winehouse, Raphael Saadiq (specifically his 2008 album The Way I See It) and Solange Knowles (her 2008 album Sol-Angel and the Hadley St. Dreams).

=== Deep and Southern ===
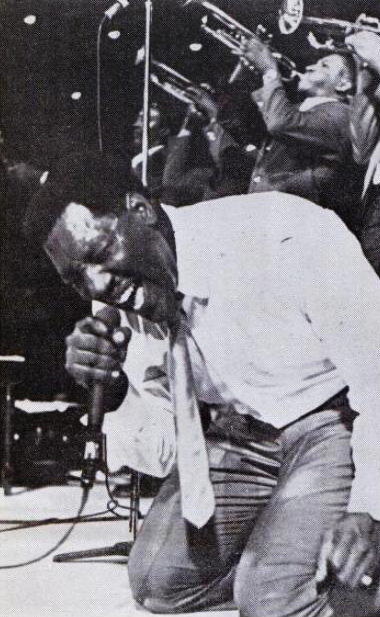
Soul singer Otis Redding was known to be an electrifying stage presence.

The terms "deep soul" and "Southern soul" generally refer to a driving, energetic soul style combining R&B's energy with pulsating southern United States gospel music sounds. Memphis, Tennessee, label Stax Records nurtured a distinctive sound, which included putting vocals further back in the mix than most contemporary R&B records, using vibrant horn parts in place of background vocals, and a focus on the low end of the frequency spectrum. The vast majority of Stax releases were backed by house bands Booker T. & the M.G.'s (with Booker T. Jones, Steve Cropper, Duck Dunn, and Al Jackson) and the Memphis Horns (the splinter horn section of the Mar-Keys, trumpeter Wayne Jackson and saxophonist Andrew Love).

=== Memphis ===
Memphis soul is a shimmering, sultry style of soul music produced in the 1960s and 1970s at Stax Records and Hi Records in Memphis, Tennessee. It featured melancholic and melodic horns, Hammond organ, bass, and drums, as heard in recordings by Hi's Al Green and Stax's Booker T. & the M.G.'s. The latter group also sometimes played in the harder-edged Southern soul style. The Hi Records house band (Hi Rhythm Section) and producer Willie Mitchell developed a surging soul style heard in the label's 1970s hit recordings. Some Stax recordings fit into this style but had their own unique sound.

=== New Orleans ===
The New Orleans soul scene directly came out of the rhythm and blues era, when such artists as Little Richard, Fats Domino, and Huey "Piano" Smith made a huge impact on the pop and R&B charts and a huge direct influence on the birth of funk music. The principal architect of Crescent City's soul was songwriter, arranger, and producer Allen Toussaint. He worked with such artists as Irma Thomas ("the Soul Queen of New Orleans"), Jessie Hill, Chris Kenner, Benny Spellman, and Ernie K-Doe on the Minit/Instant label complex to produce a distinctive New Orleans soul sound that generated a passel of national hits. Other notable New Orleans hits came from Robert Parker, Betty Harris, and Aaron Neville. While record labels in New Orleans largely disappeared by the mid-1960s, producers in the city continued to record New Orleans soul artists for other mainly New York City and Los Angeles–based record labels—notably Lee Dorsey for New York-based Amy Records and the Meters for New York–based Josie Records and then LA-based Reprise Records.

=== Chicago ===
Chicago soul generally had a light gospel-influenced sound, but the large number of record labels based in the city tended to produce a more diverse sound than other cities. Vee Jay Records, which lasted until 1966, produced recordings by Jerry Butler, Betty Everett, Dee Clark, and Gene Chandler. Chess Records, mainly a blues and rock and roll label, produced several major soul artists, including the Dells and Billy Stewart. Curtis Mayfield not only scored many hits with his group, the Impressions, but wrote many hit songs for Chicago artists and produced hits on his own labels for the Fascinations, Major Lance, and the Five Stairsteps.

=== Philadelphia ===
Based primarily in the Philadelphia International record label, Philadelphia soul (or Philly soul) had lush string and horn arrangements and doo-wop-inspired vocals. Thom Bell, and Kenneth Gamble & Leon Huff are considered the founders of Philadelphia soul, which produced hits for Patti LaBelle, the O'Jays, the Intruders, the Three Degrees, the Delfonics, the Stylistics, Harold Melvin & the Blue Notes, and the Spinners.

=== Progressive ===
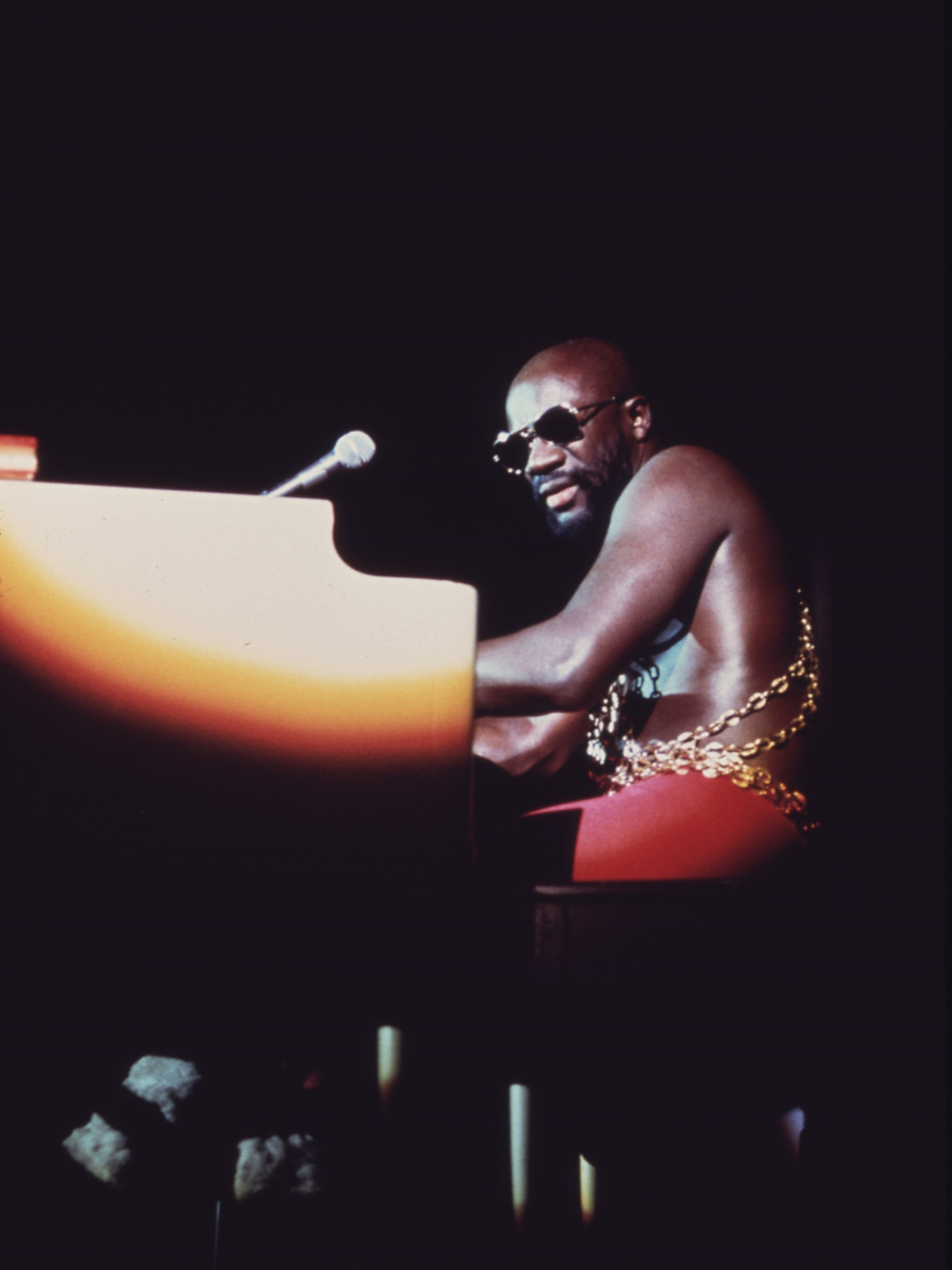
Isaac Hayes performing in 1973

By the 1970s, African-American popular musicians had drawn from the conceptual album-oriented approach of the then-burgeoning progressive rock development. This progressive-soul development inspired a newfound sophisticated musicality and ambitious lyricism in black pop. Among these musicians were Sly Stone, Stevie Wonder, Marvin Gaye, Curtis Mayfield, and George Clinton. In discussing the progressive soul of the 1970s, Martin cites this period's albums from Wonder (Talking Book, Innervisions, Songs in the Key of Life), War (All Day Music, The World Is a Ghetto, War Live), and the Isley Brothers (3 + 3). Isaac Hayes's 1969 recording of "Walk On By" is considered a "classic" of prog-soul, according to City Pages journalist Jay Boller. Later prog-soul music includes recordings by Prince, Peter Gabriel, Meshell Ndegeocello, Joi, Bilal, Dwele, Anthony David, Janelle Monáe, and the Soulquarians, an experimental black-music collective active during the late 1990s and early 2000s.

=== Psychedelic ===
Psychedelic soul, sometimes known as "black rock", was a blend of psychedelic rock and soul music in the late 1960s, which paved the way for the mainstream emergence of funk music a few years later. Early pioneers of this subgenre of soul music include Jimi Hendrix, Sly and the Family Stone, Norman Whitfield, and Isaac Hayes. While psychedelic rock began its decline, the influence of psychedelic soul continued on and remained prevalent through the 1970s.

=== British ===
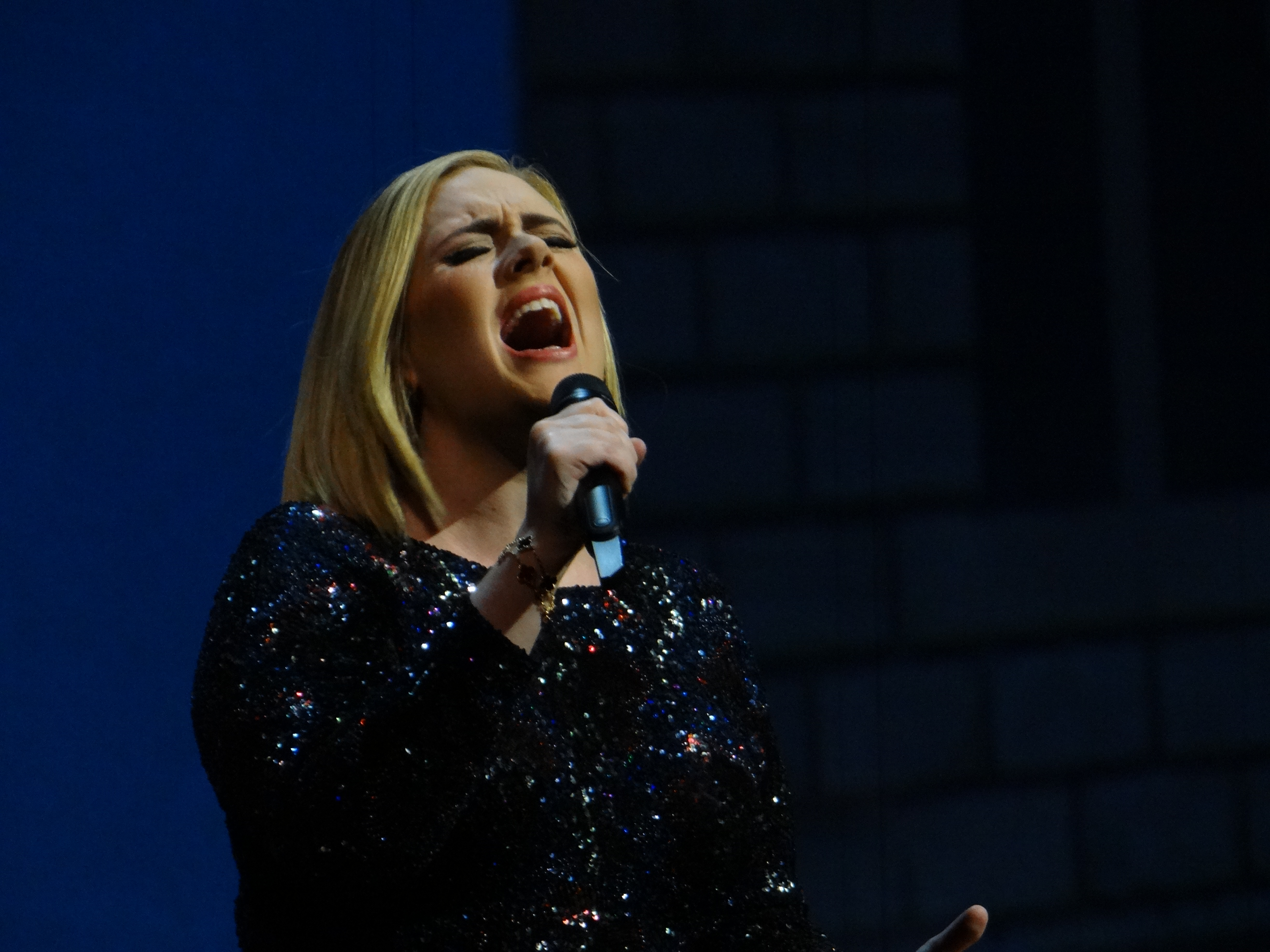
Adele performing in 2016

In the early 1960s, small soul scenes began popping up around the UK. Liverpool in particular had an established black community from which artists such as Chants and Steve Aldo emerged and go on to record within the British music industry. As a result, many recordings were commercially released by British soul acts during the 1960s which were unable to connect with the mainstream market. Nevertheless, soul has been a major influence on British popular music since the 1960s including bands of the British Invasion, most significantly the Beatles. There were a handful of significant British blue-eyed soul acts, including Dusty Springfield and Tom Jones. In the 1970s Carl Douglas, the Real Thing and Delegation had hits in the UK. American soul was extremely popular among some youth sub-cultures like the mod, Northern soul and modern soul movements, but a clear genre of British soul did not emerge until the 1980s when several artists including George Michael, Sade, Simply Red, Lisa Stansfield and Soul II Soul enjoyed commercial success. The popularity of British soul artists in the U.S., most notably Amy Winehouse, Adele, Estelle, Duffy, Joss Stone and Leona Lewis, led to talk of a "Third British Invasion" or "British Soul Invasion" in the 2000s and 2010s.

=== Neo ===
Neo soul is a blend of 1970s soul-style vocals and instrumentation with contemporary R&B sounds, hip-hop beats, and poetic interludes. The style was developed in the early to mid-1990s, and the term was coined in the early 1990s by producer and record label executive Kedar Massenburg. A key element in neo-soul is a heavy dose of Fender Rhodes or Wurlitzer electronic piano "pads" over a mellow, grooving interplay between the drums (usually with a rim shot snare sound) and a muted, deep funky bass. The Fender Rhodes piano sound gives the music a warm, organic character.

Notable artists include Jill Scott, Lauryn Hill, Aloe Blacc and Erykah Badu. Newer artists like H.E.R. and SZA are also influenced by neo soul.

=== Northern ===
Northern soul is a music and dance movement that emerged in the late 1960s out of the British mod subculture in Northern England and the English Midlands, based on a particular style of soul music with a heavy beat and fast tempo. The phrase northern soul was coined by a journalist Dave Godin and popularised through his column in Blues and Soul magazine. The rare soul records were played by DJs at nightclubs, and included obscure 1960s and early 1970s American recordings with an uptempo beat, such as those on Motown and smaller labels, not necessarily from the Northern United States.

=== Nu jazz and other influenced electronica ===
Many artists in various genres of electronic music (such as house, drum and bass, UK garage, and downtempo) are heavily influenced by soul, and have produced many soul-inspired compositions.

== See also ==
- Neo soul
- List of soul musicians
- Funk
- Disco
- African-American music
- Music of the United States

== Bibliography ==
- Adams, Michael (2008). Review of Atlantic Records: The House That Ahmet Built, by Susan Steinberg. Notes 65 (1), pgs. 157-158.
- Cummings, Tony (1975). The Sound of Philadelphia. London: Eyre Methuen.
- Escott, Colin. (1995). Liner notes for The Essential James Carr. Razor and Tie Records.
- Gillett, Charlie (1974). Making Tracks. New York: E. P. Dutton.
- Guralnick, Peter (1986). Sweet Soul Music. New York: Harper & Row.
- Hannusch, Jeff (1985). I Hear You Knockin': The Sound of New Orleans Rhythm and Blues. Ville Platte, LA: Swallow Publications. ISBN 0-9614245-0-8.
- Hoard, Christian; Brackett, Nathan, eds. (2004). The New Rolling Stone Album Guide. Simon & Schuster. ISBN 9780743201698.
- Hoskyns, Barney (1987). Say it One More Time for the Broken Hearted. Glasgow: Fontana/Collins.
- Jackson, John A. (2004). A House on Fire: The Rise and Fall of Philadelphia Soul. New York: Oxford University Press. ISBN 0-19-514972-6.
- Martin, Bill (1998), Listening to the Future: The Time of Progressive Rock, Chicago: Open Court, ISBN 0-8126-9368-X
- Miller, Jim (editor) (1976). The Rolling Stone Illustrated History of Rock & Roll. New York: Rolling Stone Press/Random House. ISBN 0-394-73238-3. Chapter on "Soul," by Guralnick, Peter, pp. 194–197.
- Pareles, Jon. 2004. Estelle Stewart Axton, 85, A Founder of Stax Records. New York Times. February 27, 2004, Section A, Page 25.
- Pruter, Robert (1991). Chicago Soul: Making Black Music Chicago-Style. Urbana, Illinois: University of Illinois Press. ISBN 0-252-01676-9.
- Pruter, Robert, editor (1993). Blackwell Guide to Soul Recordings. Oxford: Basil Blackwell Ltd. ISBN 0-631-18595-X.
- Rolling Stone 500 Greatest Songs of All Time. Alfred Music. June 19, 2008. ISBN 978-0739075784.
- Walker, Don (1985). The Motown Story. New York: Charles Scribner's Sons.
- Winterson, Julia, Nickol, Peter, Bricheno, Toby (2003). Pop Music: The Text Book, Edition Peters. ISBN 1-84367-007-0.
