= Jerry Goldstein (producer) =

American musician and record executive (born 1940)

- Born: Gerald Goldstein; February 17, 1940 (age 86)
- Occupations: Record producer; manager; singer-songwriter; film producer; graphics company owner; musician; entrepreneur
- Years active: 1952–present
- Labels: Motown; EMI; Jive; Disney; Hollywood; RCA; Safehouse; Universal; Republic
- Formerly of: The Strangeloves

Gerald Goldstein (born February 17, 1940) is an American producer, singer-songwriter, talent manager, music executive, musician and entrepreneur. He was one of the members of The Strangeloves, the co-writer of "My Boyfriend's Back" (a hit song in 1963 for The Angels) and "Come on Down to My Boat", the producer and a songwriter for the band War, and the former manager of Sly Stone. Goldstein produced the 1963 single "where did my Jimmy go?"/"Ta la la, I love you" for the Diamond Record label featuring teenage singer, Nancy Baron. Goldstein was part of a three-person production team which wrote and produced numerous records which are referred to as "FGG" – Feldman, Goldstein and Gottehrer. The numerous artists and their work in collaboration with FGG are listed in a Discography included in the references below.

== Background ==
He was born in Brooklyn, New York and lives in Pacific Palisades, California.

Along with Steve Gold, Jerry Goldstein headed the Los Angeles-based LAX Records label.

== Music career ==
=== The Strangeloves ===
Goldstein was a member of the band The Strangeloves along with Bob Feldman and Richard Gottehrer, responsible for the hit song "I Want Candy."

The band formed in 1964 under a fictionalized origins story, pretending to be three musical brothers (named Giles, Miles and Niles) raised on an Australian sheep farm. "I Want Candy" reached as high as #11 on the US Hot 100 and #7 on the Canada RPM 100 lists.

The Strangeloves' only LP, I Want Candy, was released in 1965 on Bert Berns' songwriter label Bang Records, with several of the album songs having been released as singles. Other singles by The Strangeloves appeared on Swan Records and Sire Records.

In early 1966, the lineup was replaced by guitarist Jack Raczka (Giles Strange), drummer-vocalist Joe Piazza (Miles Strange), and keyboardist-vocalist Ken Jones (Niles Strange). In 1968, bass player Greg Roman became an integral part of the band.

=== The McCoys ===
While with The Strangeloves, Goldstein contributed to bringing The McCoys aboard Bang Records. The McCoys sang over the original backing track for "Hang On Sloopy", which was originally earmarked for a Strangeloves album. Both groups went on tour that summer, starting with The McCoys supporting The Strangeloves; by the end of the tour, "Sloopy" had reached #1 and The McCoys were the headliners.

=== Sly Stone ===
Goldstein signed Sly Stone to a management deal in 1989, hoping to revive the faded flame of his career.

The two, along with Goldstein's colleague Glenn Stone (no relation to Sly), formed Even Street Productions. In 2002, they renegotiated his Sly and the Family Stone record deal with Sony which gave birth to a reissue of the catalog, a box set (The Collection) and Different Strokes by Different Folks, a remix and the all-star remix and cover album paying tribute to the music of Sly and the Family Stone.

While the collaboration did help Stone resurface in the public eye for a time, the deal ended sourly, with both Stone and Goldstein taking legal action against the other over millions of dollars in royalties. In January 2015 Stone was awarded $5 million in damages, $2.45 million of that against Goldstein. This award was entirely reversed by the court on October 4, 2016.

=== WAR (1969-current) ===
Goldstein has produced every album in WAR’s catalog dating back to Eric Burdon Declares ‘WAR’ in 1970, which included the chart-topping hit "Spill The Wine".

In 1969, Goldstein saw musicians who would eventually become WAR playing at the Rag Doll in North Hollywood, backing Deacon Jones, and he was attracted to the band's sound. Band member Leroy "Lonnie" Jordan claimed that the band's goal was to spread a message of brotherhood and harmony, using instruments and voices to speak out against racism, hunger, gangs, crime, and promote hope and the spirit of brotherhood.

The group had an extensive run of hits from 1971 until 1977 with United Artists Records, including five million-sellers. "Low Rider" was a #1 R&B hit in 1975, while "The Cisco Kid" reached #2 on the Billboard Hot 100 in 1973.

The band WAR disbanded and four of the original members left the band WAR and formed the Lowrider Band. Jerry Goldstein took them to court and sued for rights to the name of the band and won so now there is the band WAR with only Lonnie as the original band member. All other original band members and songwriters are in the Lowrider Band.

=== Additional credits ===
In 1968, Goldstein's song "It's Nice To Be With You" was recorded by The Monkees and released as the B-side to "D.W. Washburn".

Goldstein produced the single "Spirit of '76" b/w "Anyway I'm Busted" for the band Booty People, which was a hit on the Billboard Hot Soul Singles chart in 1976.

In the 1990s and 2000s, Goldstein, along with Glenn Stone and Bruce Garfield, managed Isaac Hayes, and signed, managed, produced and promoted the successful three-man pop/rap group LFO (best known for their hits "Summer Girls" and "Girl on TV").

== Merchandising ==
=== Jimi Hendrix and The Visual Thing ===
In 1968, Goldstein together with longtime business partner Steve Gold and started The Visual Thing, a tour book and album artwork company that produced and owned photography, video and merchandise associated with musical talents, most notably Jimi Hendrix.

Hendrix was the first artist to sign an exclusive merchandising agreement with The Visual Thing. According to Jimi’s sister Janie Hendrix, the agreement was to split merchandise revenue 50/50 with Goldstein.

According to the company's website, other artists who signed deals with The Visual Thing include The Rolling Stones, Led Zeppelin, Blind Faith, Bee Gees, Sly and The Family Stone, Joe Cocker, Cream, The Beach Boys, Eric Burdon, The Doors, Iron Butterfly, Creedence Clearwater Revival, the Steve Miller Band, Donovan and Frank Zappa.

== Legacy ==
=== Covers and samples ===
The WAR songs "Low Rider" and "Why Can’t We Be Friends" remain oft-licensed songs (as in the video game Grand Theft Auto V, the film The Internship and Pepsi commercials). A sample from WAR member Lee Oskar’s "San Francisco Bay" is featured in the single by Pitbull featuring Kesha, "Timber," which has achieved #1 status in 30 countries.

The Strangeloves' "I Want Candy" was covered by the band Bow Wow Wow in 1982 to great success, particularly in the UK, and again in 2000 by teen sensation Aaron Carter. The Bow Wow Wow version has appeared in many popular films and commonly figures among listings of the iconic songs of the 1980s. The song also appears on Carter’s 2001 DVD release Aaron’s Party: Live in Concert. Candy Girls and Melanie C also covered the song to commercial success.

Goldstein's songwriting has been re-used in various hip-hop samples including songs by Pitbull, Rick Ross, Kendrick Lamar, Lil Wayne, Mac Miller, Wiz Khalifa, Shaggy, Cypress Hill, J Dilla, LL Cool J, Beastie Boys, Tupac, Method Man, Redman, Janet Jackson, and Geto Boys.

=== Popular culture ===
Goldstein's songs have also been featured in many prominent movies, television shows, and video games such as Dazed and Confused, The Internship, Up In Smoke, RocknRolla, Mean Girls, The Simpsons, Entourage, Family Guy, The George Lopez Show, Ellen, The Wire, That '70s Show, Grand Theft Auto V and Rock Band 3.

While at Uni Records, Goldstein helped sign Marcia Strassman (later known as an actress on Welcome Back Kotter), who recorded a song whose title defined an era: "The Flower Children." Goldstein and his DJ friend Tim Hudson have been credited with coining the terms "Flower Power," "Flower Children," "Flower Music" and "The Flower Generation."
