= Howard E. Scott =

American funk/rock guitarist (born 1946)

- Born: March 15, 1946 (age 80); San Pedro, Los Angeles, California, U.S.
- Genres: Funk; rock
- Occupations: Musician; songwriter; bandleader
- Instruments: Guitar; Vocals
- Years active: 1964–present
- Website: Lowriderband.com

Howard E. Scott (born March 15, 1946) is an American funk/rock guitarist and founding member of the successful 1970s funk band War.

== Biography ==
Scott grew up in Compton, California. He began playing bass at a very young age under the guidance of his cousin, Jack Nelson, and in 1961 began playing guitar. A year later, he formed a group called the Creators with Harold Brown, and together they played at high school dances, car club parties and small nightclubs in southern California. Scott was influenced by blues artists T.J. Summerville, Howlin Wolf, Muddy Waters, Jimmy Reed and Wayne Bennett. He frequented the local blues clubs in South Los Angeles to study professionals such as Lowell Fulson, Johnny Guitar Watson and T-Bone Walker.

Howard graduated from Compton High School in 1964 where he was on the school's dance band and cross country team. He toured with The Drifters for a short time until he was drafted into the United States Army in 1966. Upon his return, he formed his second group, The Night Shift, with Harold Brown. In 1969, the Night Shift was performing at the Rag Doll club in North Hollywood, when Eric Burdon and Lee Oskar stopped in to hear them play. Lee Oskar went to the stage to join in on a jam, and the next day Eric Burdon, Lee Oskar, Charles Miller, Papa Dee Allen, Lonnie Jordan and Peter Rosen joined Scott and Brown to form the band War.

Scott contributed lyrics, music and co-produced some of War's greatest hits, such as "Cisco Kid", "Slipping into Darkness" and "Why Can’t We Be Friends?". He was also the frontman and leader of the group. Scott and other members eventually left the original band in the 1990s, losing the right to use the band's name.

Scott now performs regularly with his nephew, B.B. Dickerson, Lee Oskar and Harold Brown as the Lowrider Band.
