= Charles Miller (musician) =

American musician (1939–1980)

- Born: Charles William Miller; June 2, 1939; Olathe, Kansas, U.S.
- Died: June 4, 1980 (aged 41) Los Angeles, California. U.S.
- Genres: Funk; rock
- Occupation: Musician
- Instruments: Saxophone; flute; clarinet; vocals
- Years active: 1969–1980
- Formerly of: War

Charles William Miller (June 2, 1939 – June 4, 1980) was an American musician best known as the saxophonist and flutist for the multicultural California funk band War. Notably, Miller provided lead vocals as well as saxophone on the band's Billboard R&B number one hit "Low Rider" (1975).

== Early life ==
Miller was born in Olathe, Kansas. Two years after his birth, Miller moved with his family to Los Angeles and settled in Long Beach, California. His father was a musician who featured with organist Paul Bryant.

Miller had a passion for music and played the woodwinds, piano, and guitar in school bands and orchestras. Miller's interest in music was secondary to football until he sustained an injury in 1967 at Long Beach City College.

== Career ==
Miller recorded with various groups such as Señor Soul on Señor Soul Plays Funky Favorites (1968), and It's Your Thing (1969), both on Double Shot Records. He participated in recording sessions with The Ray Charles Band, and toured with the Debonaires, Brenton Wood, Señor Soul, and Afro Blues Quintet + 1.

In the summer of 1969, Miller was in Hollywood at the first Studio Instrument Rentals (located on Santa Monica and Vine) when he met Harold Brown, Howard E. Scott, and Papa Dee Allen. Together, they formed the band Night Shift.

Eric Burdon and Lee Oskar later joined the band after watching Miller and the Night Shift play at the club Rag Doll in North Hollywood.

Miller’s deep voice is heard on the War song "Low Rider", and he is credited by many sources as the dominant and initial songwriter of "Low Rider". It was recorded at Wally Heider Studios in San Francisco in 1975 and has been sampled by many artists such as Flo Rida, who used it for his song "G.D.F.R."). The song is also used in the movies Up in Smoke, Paulie, Beverly Hills Chihuahua, and Dazed and Confused, and is the theme song for the television sitcom George Lopez.

== Death ==
On June 4, 1980, two days after his 41st birthday, Miller was stabbed to death in Los Angeles during a botched street robbery. To this day, no one has been arrested or prosecuted for his murder. At the time of his death, he was living in Hollywood with his wife, Eddy Miller; daughters, Annette and Laurian; and his sons, Donald and Mark. He also had a son, Joseph Charles Newton, with another woman.

== See also ==
- List of unsolved murders (1980–1999)
