= Harold Ray Brown =

American drummer

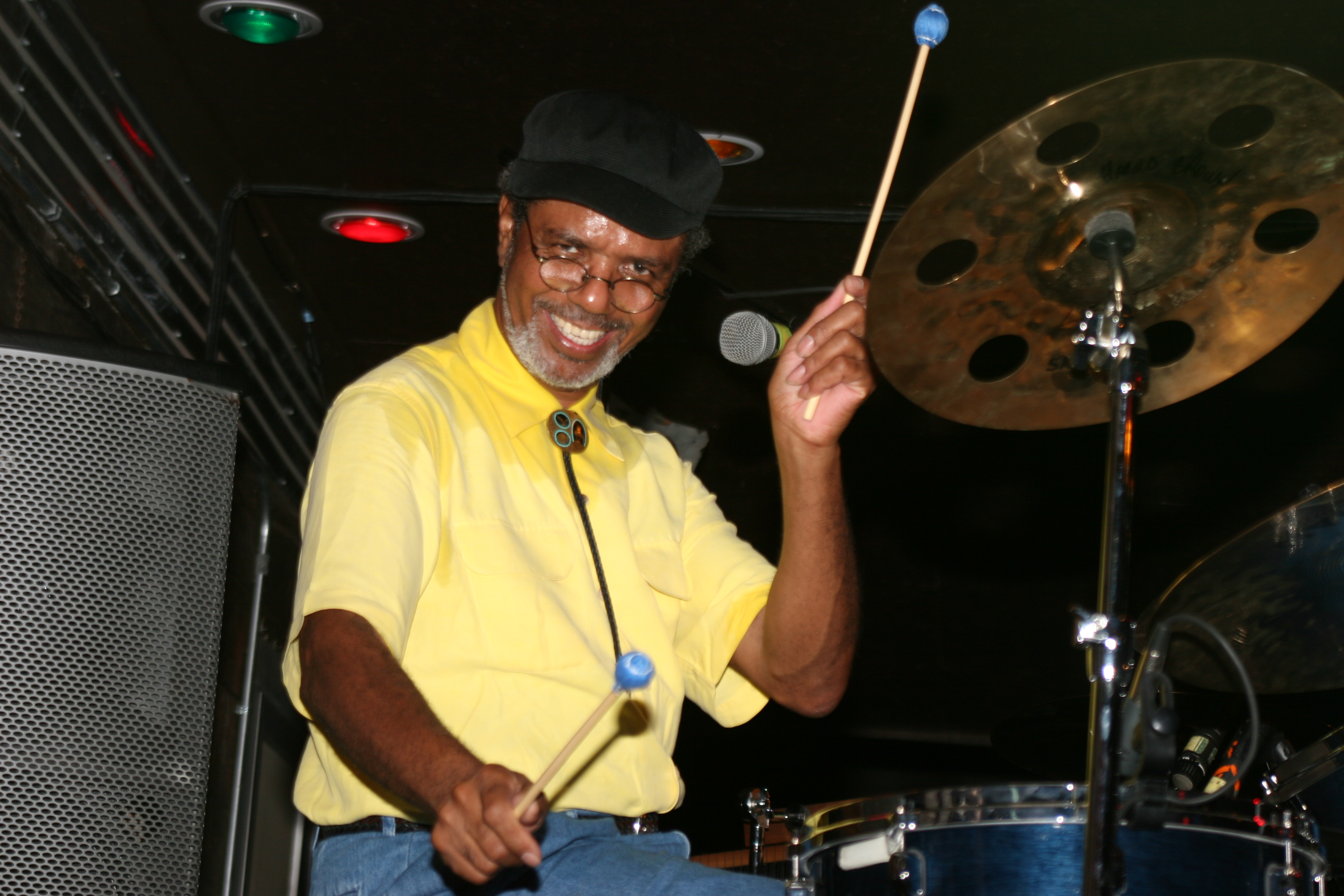
- Brown in 2009

Background information
- Born: 17 March 1946 (age 79)
- Origin: Long Beach, California, United States
- Genres: Rock; funk; blues; jazz
- Occupations: Musician; songwriter
- Instrument: Drums
- Years active: 1966–present

Harold Ray Brown (born March 17, 1946) is a founding member of War, an American funk band in the 1970s to 2000s. Harold had a number of roles over the years, acting as drummer, percussionist, vocalist, and bandleader.

Brown is the oldest of six children, and the only one in his family to pursue music. He was introduced to music at the First Lutheran Church in Downtown Long Beach. Beginning with the congas, Brown progressed to violin while in elementary school, and took up drums in junior high. He turned down a full scholarship to Valparaiso University in 1964 in order to pursue music.

Brown was rooted in the very beginnings of War. In 1962, he met Howard E. Scott at the Cozy Lounge in Long Beach, California. They were fifteen years old at the time and were hired to play in a band for a casual gig.

Brown started a band called the Creators in 1963 in Long Beach while going to Long Beach Polytechnic High School, to play for high school sock hops and car shows. Then in 1967, toward the end of the Vietnam War, he and Howard Scott restarted the band with a new name, Night Shift. Brown had been working as a machinist on the Night Shift. In February 1969, while playing a show at the Rag Doll Night Club in North Hollywood, California, Eric Burdon and Lee Oskar jammed with the Night Shift. The band changed its name to War.

Brown left the band to attend college in 1983, majoring in computer science, with a minor in music. He then moved to New Orleans in 1986. In 2001, Brown went back to school to pursue his lifelong hobby; he is now a historian and professional tour guide in New Orleans, and has recently formed a new band called the Lowrider Band with three of the other original members of War: Howard E. Scott, Morris "BB" Dickerson, and Lee Oskar. Brown also works with inner-city youth during the summer, to promote good citizenship through the art of fine drumming.

Harold Ray Brown is a founding member of The Music for Every School Foundation .
