= Lonnie Jordan =

American musician

Le Roy Jordan
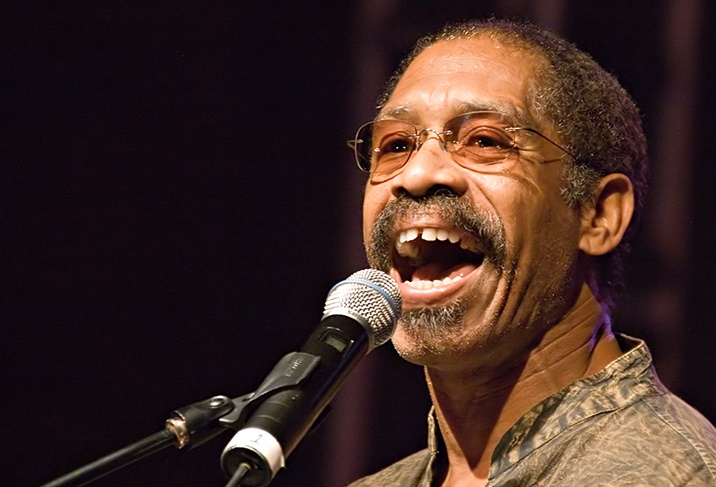
- Jordan in concert

Background information
- Also known as: Lonnie Jordan
- Born: November 21, 1948 (age 77); San Diego, California, U.S.
- Genres: Funk rock; R&B; jazz; Latin pop
- Occupations: Musician; songwriter
- Instruments: Vocals; piano; guitar; keyboards; synthesizer; percussion
- Years active: 1969–present
- Member of: War

Leroy "Lonnie" Jordan (born November 21, 1948, in San Diego) is an American musician and a founding member of the funk band War. He had a number of roles over the years, acting as vocalist and playing guitar, piano, synthesizer, and percussion. He was among the first three people to join the group after its inception, having joined before the group adopted the name "War" (it had previously been known as "the Creators" and "Nightshift"), as well as being the group's only remaining original member.

Jordan recorded as a solo artist with MCA in 1977 and Boardwalk in 1982. He has also recorded with Eric Burdon, Tanya Tucker, T. Rex and Los Lobos. Jordan also made a record with two members of War, Harold Brown and B.B. Dickerson, The Other Side of War Warms Your Heart on Soufflé Records, which featured Bobby Womack on guitar. Lonnie Jordan is the only current member of War from the original lineup. Four other members created a new group called Lowrider Band. In 2017, Lonnie Jordan co-wrote and featured on vocals on the Alex Puddu album From the Beginning on three songs "Runaway Boys", "Nobody" and "Stormy Weather".

== Discography ==
- 1978: Different Moods of Me (US: #158)
- 1982: The Affair
- 2007: War Stories (produced by J. B. Eckl and Pancho Tomaselli)
