= Lee Oskar =

Danish musician (born 1948)

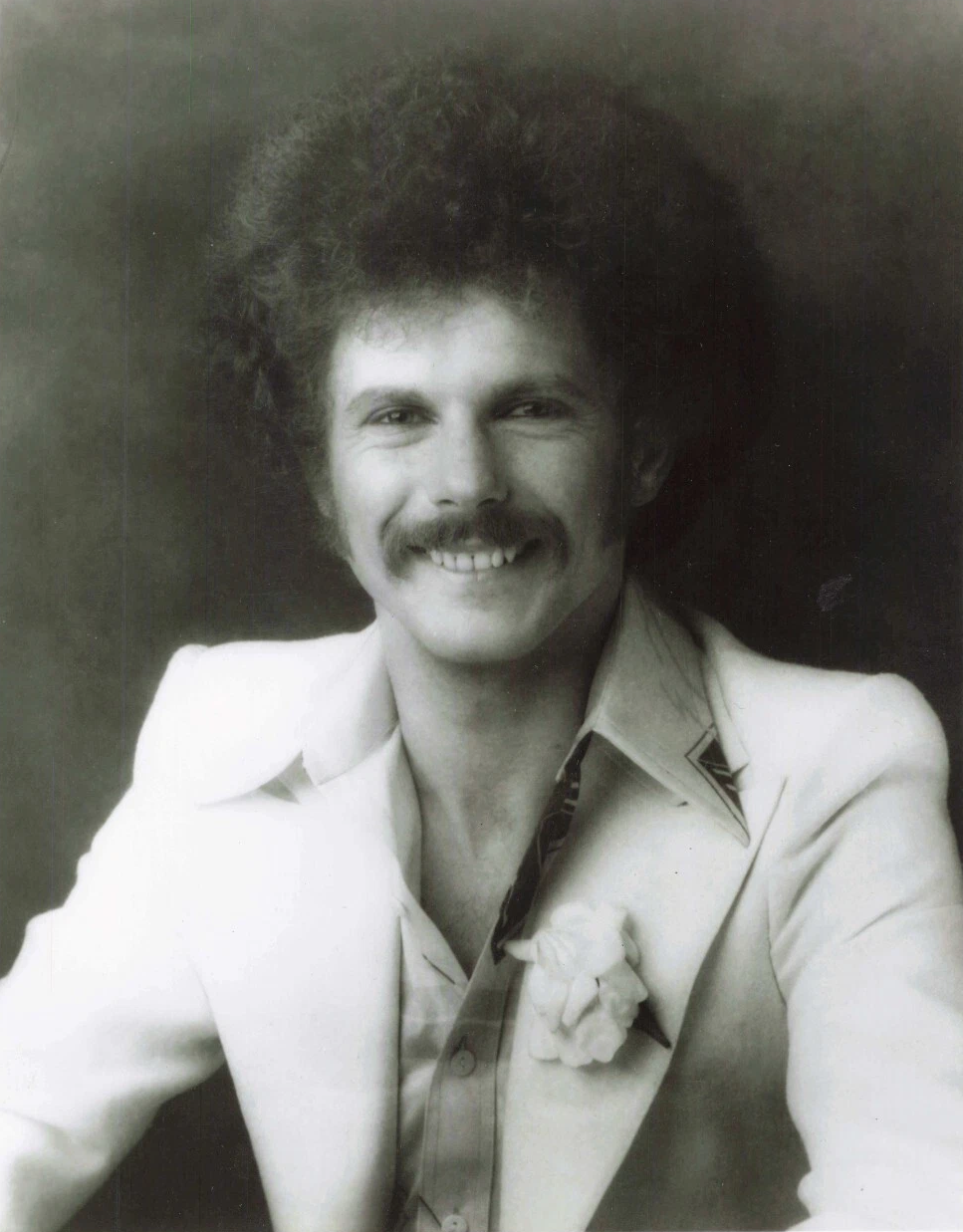
- Oskar in 1976

Background information
- Born: Lee Oskar Levitin; 24 March 1948 (age 78); Copenhagen, Denmark
- Genres: Rock; funk; blues; jazz
- Occupations: Musician; songwriter
- Instrument: Harmonica
- Years active: 1966–present
- Member of: Lowrider Band; S.O.B. (Same Old Band)
- Formerly of: War
- Website: leeoskar.com

Lee Oskar (born 24 March 1948) is a Danish harmonica player, notable for his contributions to the sound of the rock-funk fusion group War, which was formed by Howard E. Scott and Harold Brown, his solo work, and as a harmonica manufacturer. He continues to play with 3 other original War band members, Harold Brown and Howard Scott, under the name Lowrider Band.

== Early life and career ==
Born in Copenhagen, Denmark in 1948, Oskar was six years old when a family friend gave him his first harmonica. "I came from an area where every kid on the block had a harmonica", he remembers. He grew up listening to Danish radio, enjoying all types of music and cites Ray Charles as the biggest influence from that period. When he was 17, Oskar decided that the United States was where a harmonica player should make his career. So he moved to New York at the age of 18 with little more than a harmonica in his pocket. With no money, Oskar played harmonica in the streets of New York. Eventually arriving in Los Angeles, via Toronto and San Francisco, Oskar soon met and joined forces with Eric Burdon who had recently disbanded The Animals and was searching for new collaborators. Together, the harmonica-playing Dane (born Lee Oskar Levitin) and the British blues-rock singer made the rounds of the L.A. clubs, eventually hooking up with the soon-to-be members of War. Burdon agreed to the novel idea of pairing up Oskar's harmonica with Charles Miller's saxophone to form a horn section. This team-up set War apart from the start, giving Oskar room to display the full spectrum of his improvisational prowess. Oskar's harmonica magic was always a vital element in War's music and performances. Oskar continued with War for 24 years non-stop. At the end of 1992, during the time of dispute over the WAR trademark, Oskar took a few years to continue his solo career and to focus on his Lee Oskar Harmonica manufacturing.

== War ==
Oskar has been described as "a virtuoso", "the harmonica whiz", "a war hero", "legendary", a master of "musical wizardry", and considered "...among the best rock-blues-soul harmonica players". His role as a founding member and former lead harmonica player of the pioneer funk-jazz group War won him international renown for over two and a half decades (1969–1993). Oskar's signature solos helped to define the War sound from the band's beginning in 1969, adding dashes of color to its R&B, jazz, rock, and Latin influences. Oskar's position with War was a prominent one from its early days with singer Eric Burdon onward. "My playing has become more aggressive over the years", he says. "In the beginning, my role was playing horn lines. Today, it's evolved to the point where I'm playing a lead instrument. If I'm not doing a solo, I'm playing counterlines — I try to paint within certain spaces in the music to help create the overall picture."

== Solo career ==
The eclectic, multicultural nature of War's music is also evident in Oskar's solo projects. Three well regarded albums released between 1976 and 1981 brought critical and popular acclaim including being voted No. 1 Instrumental Artist of the Year for 1976 in Billboard, Cashbox and Record World. The albums, like Oskar's live performances, show the diverse influences of his musicality. A composer, his compositions have been featured on movie sound tracks and television commercials. He has been the recipient of many Gold and Platinum recordings and honored with special ASCAP Writing Awards.

His music has more recently influenced the song "Timber", which was performed by rapper Pitbull and Kesha; which was inspired by Oskar's melodic harmonica playing within his song "San Francisco Bay".

== Lee Oskar harmonica ==
In 1983, Oskar formed a company to manufacture high-quality harmonicas. His company, Lee Oskar Harmonica, sells harmonicas suited to many different styles of music, including the most common blues, folk, rock, R&B and country but Oskar's altered tunings also allows players to explore other genres such as Tango, Clave, Hip Hop, Reggae, Ska, Latin, Gypsy, Yiddish, Eastern European, Asian, and many other types of music. The harmonicas themselves are manufactured by Tombo of Japan. Oskar's harmonica company celebrated its 25th anniversary in 2008 at the NAMM Show. and has now surpassed his 35th anniversary. Lee Oskar harmonicas are praised because of replacement parts which allow changing reed plates when they become fatigued by normal use. This also allows mixing different tunings.

Several modern musicians, such as Ralph Tetrault, cited Oskar as an important influence. When Junior Wells died, he was buried with a tray of Lee Oskar harmonicas.

== Discography ==
- Lee Oskar (1976)
- Before the Rain (1978)
- My Road, Our Road (1980)
- Free - Lee Oskar featuring FURUSAWA (1997)
- Passages Through Music: Never Forget (2021)
- She Said Mahalo (2023)

== Personal life ==
Oskar lives in Everett, Washington as of 2019.
