= Nicky Love =

Australian singer, actress, model and presenter

- Born: Nicole Love; Sydney, Australia
- Occupations: Singer, actress, model, presenter
- Spouse: James White

Nicky Love is a singer, model, presenter and actress.

== Early life ==
Love was born and grew up in suburban Sydney, Australia, the shy daughter of an alcoholic father. She quit school in her early teens and dabbled in hairdressing.

== Career ==
Love began her career as a model after being discovered by Chadwick Model Management at the age of fourteen in Sydney, Australia. She subsequently appeared in magazine editorials and on magazine covers, catalogues, posters and billboards, and worked overseas with top modelling agencies in England, Spain, the U.S. and Japan.

Through her work in television commercials and music videos, she discovered an affinity for acting, leading her to study her craft at The Actors Centre in Sydney, which she followed with acting workshops in Sydney, Melbourne and Los Angeles. She subsequently landed minor guest roles on G.P. and E Street. She worked as a presenter on the music tv program Countdown Revolution, learning how to write, produce and direct in the process. She was also the anchor for an Entertainment News Show pilot for Network 10 Australia.

Additionally, Love was a founding member of Freaked Out Flower Children, alongside fellow Australian actresses Sophie Lee and Fiona Ruttelle. The other members were Gumpy Phillips and Tricky J, both formerly of Mighty Big Crime. The band released an album, Love In, through Virgin Records in 1990. The album included the single "Spill the Wine" (a remake of Eric Burdon and the band War’s 1970 single of the same name), which reached number 31 on the Australian singles charts. Their second single "Beautiful People" was met with less success, peaking at number 102. She appeared on the cover of Australian Playboy with the female members of the band in July 1992.

After the group disbanded in 1993, Love relocated to the UK, where she was eventually discovered by Robbie Robertson of The Band and became his first A&R signing to DreamWorks Records. She released her solo album Honeyvision, in 2001. She went on to work in the U.S., Europe, Australia and the U.K. with artists such as Tricky, Kylie Minogue, Michael Bolton, and Luther Vandross.

== Personal life ==
In 2000, Love married her husband, British businessman James White at the Bellagio Hotel in Las Vegas, and in 2001 they were living in Spain together.

== Filmography ==
=== Television ===
Year	Title	Role	Notes
	G.P.	Guest role	
	E Street	Guest role	
	Countdown Revolution	Host/ Reporter	
	Entertainment News	Host / Anchor	Pilot
2003	Surf Girls	Voice-over	

== Discography ==
Year	Title	Artist	Label
1991	Love In	Freaked Out Flower Children	Virgin Records
2001	Honeyvision	Nicky Love	DreamWorks
