= Ryan Moloney =

Australian actor (born 1979)

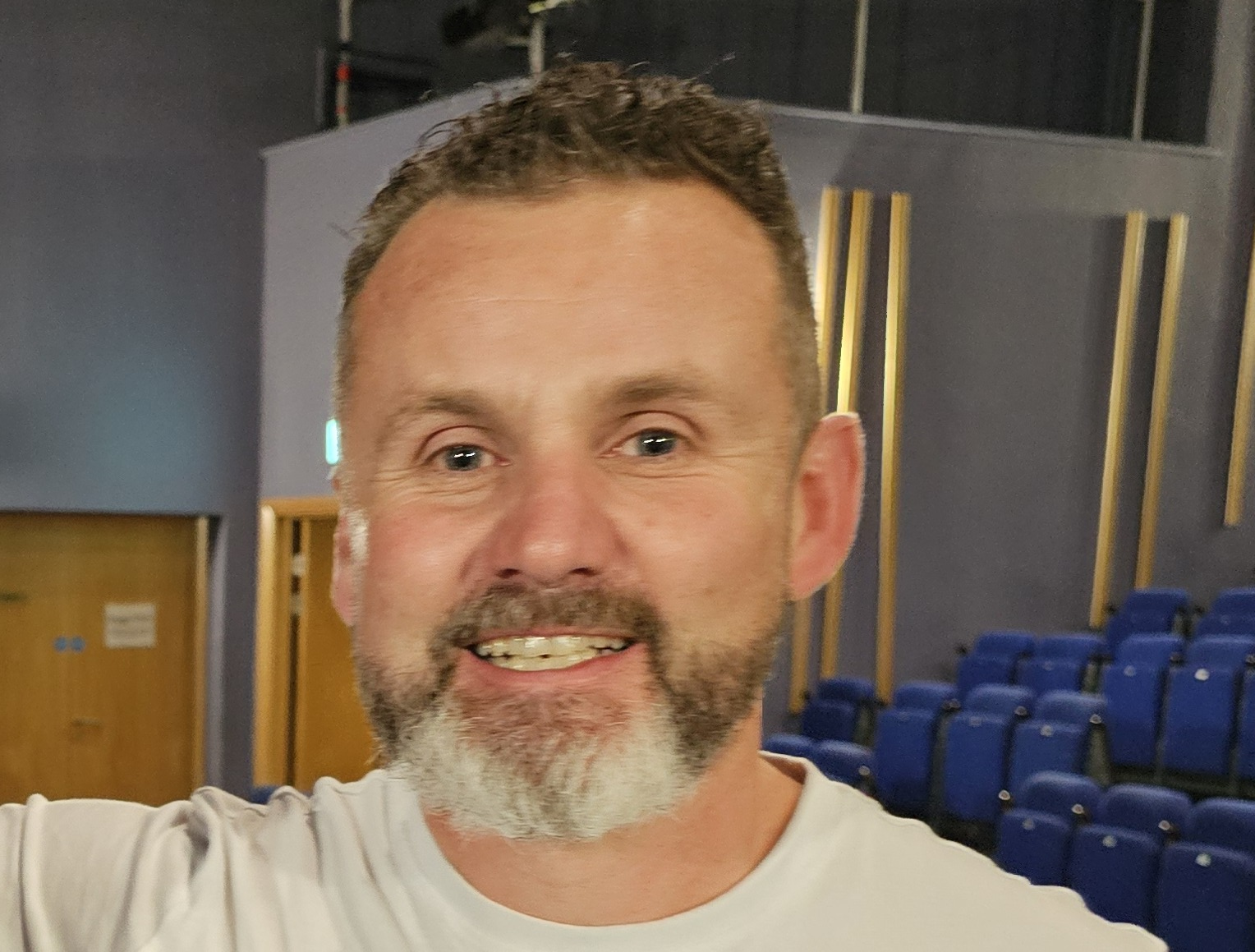
- Moloney in September 2024
- Born: 24 November 1979 (age 46); Melbourne, Victoria, Australia
- Education: Heathmont College/Emmaus College
- Occupation: Actor
- Years active: 1993–present
- Spouse: Alison Hayward (m. 2003)
- Children: 2

Ryan Moloney (born 24 November 1979) is an Australian actor, known for his portrayal of the fictional character Jarrod "Toadfish" Rebecchi in the Australian soap opera Neighbours from 1995 until his departure in 2025.

== Career ==
Moloney's first acting experience was with the Merilyn Brend Children's Teenagers and Adults Theatre Company in outer-eastern Melbourne when he was ten years old. He starred in their youth repertory production of The Purple Pumpernickel. His first role in a feature film was playing a thug in Say a Little Prayer (1993), based on the Robin Klein novel Came Back to Show You I Could Fly.

Moloney initially auditioned for the role of Brett Stark in Neighbours. He did not get the role but later appeared as a one-off character named Cyborg in 1994. He was later recalled to play Jarrod "Toadfish" Rebecchi, brother of established character Kevin "Stonefish" Rebecchi. This was a one-scene role, which aired on 23 January 1995. This became a recurring guest role and as the character proved popular it became a regular role in 1996. In April 2004 he was nominated for a Golden Rose of Montreux award for Best Actor in a Soap for his work in Neighbours.

In 1999, Molony played Mutton in the 30th anniversary production of Dimboola at the Illusions Dinner Theatre in Melbourne. Moloney appeared in the Cinderella pantomime as Buttons in 2005 and 2007.

In 2012, Moloney made an appearance on Big Brother's Bit on the Side. That same year, he appeared with his former Neighbours co-star, Mark Little, in an episode of Celebrity Wedding Planner broadcast on 3 September 2012.

In 2013 Moloney appeared on Celebrity Big Brother broadcast on Channel 5. He finished in third place. Ryan stated in an interview with Lorraine Kelly

Shortly into it, I watched some footage that they had shot and edited in a particular way and I realised that I couldn't actually be myself in there because they can edit it however they want. And the fact that I got to protect the Neighbours brand. But in terms of an experience, it was a crazy experience. It was a one-in-a-lifetime experience.

Moloney subsequently took up the roles of Jack in Dick Whittington at Dunstable's Grove Theatre in 2013 and Buttons in Cinderella at the Stag Theatre in Sevenoaks in 2014. He appeared in a documentary special celebrating Neighbours' 30th anniversary titled Neighbours 30th: The Stars Reunite, which aired in Australia and the UK in March 2015.

Moloney has filmed a part in the upcoming film titled Residence, playing Cyril the King. Following the cancellation of Neighbours in 2022, Moloney featured in The Masked Singer. He returned to Neighbours when filming resumed in April 2023, broadcast September 2023.

On 27 June 2024, Moloney announced that he would be leaving Neighbours after playing Toadie for almost 30 years. He also announced that he would be pursuing a directing career and had begun training. He also directed an episode of Neighbours. Moloney later admitted that it was not his choice to leave. However, he had been thinking about leaving the show in 2022, before it was cancelled, but agreed to return for the revival. In September 2024, Moloney embarked on a one-man show around the UK called Toad on the Road.

In October 2025, Moloney was confirmed to be part of the line-up for the new series of SAS Australia titled SAS: Australia vs England.

== Personal life ==
Moloney is married to Alison Hayward and the couple have two children, Erin Moloney and Jack Moloney.

Moloney is an active patron of the Down Syndrome Association of Victoria, and has been involved with the Victorian Police Department's Films For Schools Youth project. He also participates in the Forgotten Children Rescue Foundation charity.

In 2010, Moloney became a spokesman for weight loss company Lite and Easy, successfully losing 17 kg in 13 weeks. He also competed in the St. George Melbourne Marathon, completing the race in the official time of 03:46:32.

In early 2011, Moloney revealed that he was training to be a pilot. He took on the hobby in between filming for Neighbours and aims to fly commercial planes in the future.

He attended school at Heathmont College and Emmaus College.

== Filmography ==
Year	Title	Role	Notes
1993	Say a Little Prayer	Thug	
1994	Neighbours	Cyborg	1 episode (episode #2123)
1995–2025	Neighbours	Toadfish Rebecchi	Regular role
2000	Enemies Closer	Terry	
2005	Dick & Dom in da Bungalow	Himself	Also called 'Toadie from Neighbours'
2006	Massacre of the Innocents	Simon	Short film
2013	Celebrity Big Brother 11	Himself	Reality
2015	Neighbours 30th: The Stars Reunite	Himself	Documentary
2015	Shaun Micallef's Mad as Hell	The Duke of Wales	Comedy
2022	The Masked Singer	Himself	
TBA	Residence	Cyril the King	Film
2026	Celebrity SAS: Who Dares Wins	Himself	
