= Fiona Ruttelle =

Australian singer, actress, model and artist

- Occupations: Singer, actress, model, artist
- Years active: 1989–1993
- Known for: Say a Little Prayer (1993); Freaked Out Flower Children

Fiona Ruttelle is an Australian actress, singer, model and artist.

== Career ==
Ruttelle starred in the Richard Lowenstein directed movie Say a Little Prayer, in the co-lead role of Angie, alongside child actor Sudi de Winter. She received an AFI Award nomination for Best Actress in a Lead Role for her role in the film.

She was also a member of the band Freaked Out Flower Children, alongside fellow actresses Sophie Lee and Nicky Love. The other members were Gumpy Phillips and Tricky J, both formerly of Mighty Big Crime. The band released the album Love In through Virgin Records in 1991. It included the single "Spill the Wine", (a remake of Eric Burdon and the band War’s 1970 single of the same name), which reached number 31 on the Australian single charts. Their second single "Beautiful People" was met with less success, peaking at number 102. The group disbanded in 1993.

Rutelle appeared on the cover of Australian Playboy with the female members of the Freaked Out Flower Children in July 1992.

According to her Instagram page, Ruttelle currently owns a business called 'Right Brain Tribe', specialising in essential oils, which operates from the Kuranda Markets in Cairns, North Queensland. She also currently works as a DJ.

== Filmography ==
=== Film ===
Year	Title	Role	Notes
1989	Cruel Youth		Short film
1993	Say a Little Prayer	Angie	Feature film

=== Television ===
Year	Title	Role	Notes
	Rockwaves		
	Countdown Revolution		
