= Hating Alison Ashley =

Hating Alison Ashley may refer to:

- Hating Alison Ashley (novel), a 1984 novel
- Hating Alison Ashley (film), a 2005 film based on the novel
