= Australian Playboy =

Australian magazine

- Cover of the March 1997 issue, featuring Melissa George
- Categories: Men's magazine
- Frequency: Monthly
- Publisher: EMAP Australia
- First issue: February 1979
- Final issue Number: January 2000; 252
- Country: Australia
- Language: English

Australian Playboy was an Australian imprint of Playboy magazine, running between 1979 and 2000, during which time 252 issues were published.

== Content ==
In 1979 Kerry Packer's ACP Magazines secured the Australian rights to Playboy magazine.

Australian Playboy featured similar content to the lead US edition, and included interviews, feature articles and entertainment reviews. The magazine would rely heavily on the US edition for pictorials, and thus reprinted many pictorials featuring popular US Playmates and celebrities including Pamela Anderson, Erika Eleniak and Anna Nicole Smith.

An Australian Playmate of the Year would be crowned annually.

The first edition issued February 1979, featured Rosemary Paul on the cover and Karen Pini as the centerfold, selling nearly 200,000 copies.

In 1982 Packer sold the rights to Mason Stewart Publishing, publishers of surfing magazine, Tracks, and rock music magazine, RAM. Sales settled at around 140,000.

The biggest selling edition of Australian Playboy was the October 1995 issue with Dannii Minogue on the cover and Cynthia Brown as the centerfold.

By 1996 sales of the magazine had fallen to 36,000 and in 1997 Mason Stewart Publishing was taken over by British publisher EMAP International Limited, with Philip Mason becoming non-executive chairman of EMAP Australia.

Due to declining sales (circulation - 25,000), the last issue was January 2000, which featured Elina Giani on the cover and Jodi Ann Paterson as the centerfold.

Notable Australian celebrities who have appeared on the cover or in the magazine include:

- Rachel Hunter: supermodel (New Zealander)
- Emma Harrison: Neighbours actress - July, 1997
- Melissa George: Home and Away actress - March, 1997
- Dannii Minogue: international popstar and X Factor and Australia's Got Talent judge - October, 1995
- Sophie Lee: actress - July, 1992
- Nicky Love: singer, model - July, 1992
- Fiona Ruttelle: singer, actress - July, 1992
- Fiona Horne: singer, celebrity witch, writer- November, 1998
- Kym Wilson: actress - May, 1999
- Gabrielle Richens: model, actress, TV presenter - March, 1999
- Kate Ceberano: singer - January, 1989
- Melissa Tkautz: actress - December, 1996
- Wendy Botha: surfer - September, 1992
- Lynda Stoner: actress - May, 1982
- Elle Macpherson: model, actress - August, 1995 & June, 1996
- Rhapsody: a musical duo (Kymberlie Harrison and Cathy Ford) - August, 1993
- Abigail: actress - August, 1980

== See also ==
- Playboy
