= Heathmont College =

Location
- Waters Grove; Heathmont, Victoria, 3135; Australia
- Coordinates: 37°50′18″S 145°13′56″E

Information
- Type: Public, secondary
- Motto: Learning through Knowledge
- Established: 1993
- Principal: Kerryn Sandford
- Enrolment: 700
- Colours: Maroon, navy blue and white
- Website: Heathmont College

Heathmont College is a coeducational government secondary college located in Heathmont, Victoria. It is located between Waters Grove, Marlborough Road and Hardy Crescent.

== History ==
Established in 1993 following the amalgamation of Eastern Secondary College and Heathmont Secondary College, the college operated as a dual campus school until it was consolidated onto the Waters Grove (Junior & Middle School) campus for the start of Term 2, 2003.

== Composition of school ==
Heathmont College is organised into a house structure. Houses are overseen by a head of house and house leader.

Houses operate on a vertical structure incorporates all students in Years 7–12. It is designed to ensure ongoing pastoral care throughout the student's time at the College. A new Year 9 "Life" program commenced in 2017. This focuses on four key areas – Work, Body and Mind, Community Service and Leadership. The success of the program led to an associated program called with Discover which is based within the new house structure.

The school currently focuses on ensuring that Year 7 students have a smooth transition from primary school to secondary school. There is a range of programs that the school provides Year 7 students with to participate in ranging from a camp in the first week, to great leadership opportunities and student wellbeing programs. An extensive transition program has been implemented to assist students as they move into secondary education. There is also a range of opportunities for Year 8's such as becoming members of the Student Representative Council. There are pastoral care sessions to ensure Year Eights are getting the most of their schooling. In Year Nine, students are able to select from a broad range of electives. This provides students with a great range of choice and responsibility. The program goes over the course of a year and allows the students to work in a range of situations in different groups and individually. The objectives of the program are to provide students with good life skills and to have student centered learning. A significantly revised program of offerings was developed and introduced at the Years 9 and 10 allowing for significant opportunities for students to engage in extension activities. While in the 9 Life program, students are provided with the opportunity to go into Melbourne City and participate in a wide range of activities based on what the students are currently learning in class as well as some fun and exciting activities.

=== Heads of houses ===
The houses are called Red (Monash), Yellow (Flynn), Blue (Gilmore) and Green (Hollows).

Throughout 2019 the houses will decide on their names and mascots in addition to determining what charities they will support. A Central tour for Year 11 students and a Valedictory Ball, and a Year 12 Study Camp at the Lord Somers Camp are some of the functions available for students to participate in.

=== Programs and subjects ===
==== German immersion program ====
Heathmont College offers a comprehensive German program whereby students undertake not only a German language class but are taught two subjects in German. For example, in Year 7 students are taught science and humanities immersed in German.

==== Sport ====
The college offers various outdoor and indoor physical activities including: swimming and diving, athletics and cross-country skiing and competitions in badminton, basketball, netball, soccer, volleyball, tennis, table tennis, cricket, football, golf, and hockey.

==== Excel program ====
The Excel program has recently been introduced to the College to improve its academic outcomes. Students are selected on the basis of testing conducted at the College prior to the commencement of Year 7. This program supports and extends students in mathematics and English through to Year 10. The recent, significant improvement in NAPLAN results are a result of the increase in academic rigour at the College. 2017 saw the introduction of the German CLIL program in which students study a rigorous language program which includes two subjects being taught in German as well as a German Language subject. The College benefited from significant support from the Goethe Institute to develop this program. Year 7 students study science and humanities in the German language. In 2016 a rigorous subject completion policy was introduced throughout the College.

==== Victorian Certificate of Education (VCE) ====
The Victorian Certificate of Education (VCE) is offered to all students in Years 11 and 12. Many VCE subjects are also offered to Year 10 students. Those Year 10 students who satisfactorily complete Units 1 and 2 in a subject are permitted to continue that study at the Unit 3 and 4 level in Year 11, alongside their Year 12 peers. This acceleration makes a significant contribution to the maximisation of their Australian Tertiary Admission Rank (ATAR) at the completion of VCE. A broad range of subjects is offered, including Chemistry, Physics, Outdoor Education, History, Global Politics, English Literature, German, Indonesian, Accounting, Methods and Specialist Mathematics, Legal Studies and Business Management. From 2014, the College saw a distinct improvement in ATAR scores obtained by students and 99% of students obtained a first round offer into such diverse fields as law, medicine, environmental engineering, nursing, and archaeology. The College was awarded a Premier's Award in Chemistry in 2016. In 2017, the College was once more reported as obtaining higher than expected results in the VCE in the DET generated Annual Report.

=== School Values ===
In 2022 the college developed 3 new values. to guide its developing growth.

‘Community’, ‘Compassion’, and ‘ Curiosity’

== Build & Grounds Work ==
The college has seen minor improvements to its buildings and grounds since 2019. This included building of a Basketball stadium with a single court and attached Performing Arts Centre. Redevelopment of the colleges Steam room and Hope Centre have also been undertaken. Promised improvements from MP Jackson Taylor including redevelopment of its Food Technology Labs are yet to have been followed through with

== Notable alumni ==
- Danny Allsopp of Melbourne Victory in the A-League.
- Chris Hemsworth – Actor (Star Trek, Home & Away, The Avengers, Snow White and the Huntsman, Thor and M.I.B).
- Ryan Moloney – Actor (Plays Jarrod 'Toadfish' Rebecchi in Neighbours).
- Susan Carland – Academic and Australian Muslim of the Year 2004. Host of the forthcoming SBS Quiz Show – Child Genius.
- Liam Hemsworth – Actor (The Last Song, The Hunger Games, Neighbours).
- Bodi Turner – Olympic BMX cyclist 2016.
- Andrew Pask - Chief Biological Officer, Colossal Australia.
- Jay Croucher – Lead betting analyst for NBC Sports and Co-host of Fantasy Football Happy Hour with Matthew Berry
