= Tania Lacy =

Australian comedian

- Born: Tania Jane Lacy; 30 July 1965 (age 61); Singapore
- Citizenship: Australian
- Education: Victorian College of the Arts (VCA) (1984–1986)
- Occupations: Comedian; actress; writer; dancer; choreographer
- Spouse: Ole Sturm (m. 2000–present)
- Children: 1

Tania Jane Lacy is an Australian comedian.

== Early life and education ==
Originally from Toowoomba, Queensland, Lacy spent many of her early years travelling with her family. Her father, then an officer in the army, was posted to Singapore (where Lacy was actually born) twice and Lacy spent a few years at Army schools.

== Career ==
=== Ballet and choreography ===
It was in Toowoomba that Lacy attended her first ballet class and very early on exhibited some degree of talent. It wasn't until the family had settled in Melbourne's outer eastern suburbs in the late 70's that Lacy was able to attend ballet classes again. She pursued the art vigorously and at the age of 12 was accepted into the Victorian College of the Arts School of Dance. Lacy decided not to attend instead opting to complete her education at a normal high school whilst pursuing her dance training after school hours. She completed her HSC in 1983 and was again accepted into the VCA for a full-time tertiary education. During her second year Lacy suffered a serious blow to her career plans when she sustained a severe knee injury in a dancing accident. After one year of rehabilitation Lacy found that her ballet career was effectively over.

Lacy then set out on a career as a choreographer. She choreographed many fashion parades in and around Melbourne and many of today's top Australian designers such as Bettina Liano, Peter Alexander and Alannah Hill had Lacy choreograph their parades.

It was during a taping for the Australian Broadcasting Corporation that Lacy was spotted and asked to choreograph and appear in Kylie Minogue's first clip The Loco-Motion in 1987.

=== Television ===
Later that same year while dancing on Countdown, Lacy was spotted by Molly Meldrum who asked Lacy to open the show - her performance led to a job on a new show, The Factory on which she appeared weekly as roving reporter. Under the guidance of producers Neill Wilson and James Lipscombe, Lacy began to develop her own characters and sketches. In 1989 the ABC axed The Factory. At the same time, the series Countdown was reworked as Countdown Revolution which was produced by Molly Meldrum. In 1990, Lacy was made a host of the show alongside comedian Mark Little. Later that year, Mark and Tania were fired from the show, when, unimpressed with lip-synching performers on the show, they staged a mock strike, which backfired.

Lacy went on to make appearances on Steve Vizard's Tonight Live but eventually found a home at Channel 9 where she initially starred on a show called Saturday at Ricks. When that show ended Lacy made many humorous appearance on shows like Midday.

In 2006 and 2007, Lacy starred in the internet/mobile web series called Girl Friday where she plays Miss Mann.

From 29 to 31 October 2007, Lacy appeared as a sexy Barrister Catherine Michael on Neighbours.

Several of Lacy's characters, such as ‘Carlos the Latin Lover’ and ‘Annette the Librarian’ are part of Australian entertainment culture.

=== The stage ===
After a period at Nine, Lacy left to pursue her own projects. She staged a one-woman, sell-out show entitled All of Me which was premiered at the Melbourne International Comedy Festival and then toured it to Sydney and Brisbane. Later the show went to the Edinburgh Comedy Festival where Tania was nominated for a Best Newcomer Award and was shortlisted for the Perrier Award.

=== Short films ===
Lacy also went on to star in a number of short films such as Titsiana Booberini, which she also wrote. The film received much international acclaim, scoring the director, Robert Luketic, a three-picture deal. She also wrote and starred in Pussy Got Your Tongue? which won her the Nicole Kidman Best Actress award at Tropfest in 1997. Later that year she starred with Ben Mendelsohn in Tangerine Dream, winning the Best Actress Award at the Watch My Shorts Festival.

In 2000, Lacy went to Los Angeles where she staged a one-woman show entitled Suburban Refugee - it did an extended run at Theatre Theater in Hollywood. It was during this time that Lacy met her now-husband, Ole Sturm.

=== Writing ===
Since returning to Australia in 2001, Lacy staged another one-woman show at the Melbourne International Comedy Festival entitled Tania Lacy is Coo Coo Bananas, but more recently she has remained out of the spotlight, focusing instead on the development of various film and TV scripts for local production company, MoodyStreet Kids, amongst them her Virtually Kitty film and a TV series she has developed with Miho Suzuki Gollings.

Lacy was also approached by publisher Scholastic to write a book series for young girls. Her first book "Tracy Lacy is Completely Coo Coo Bananas" was released in 2016, followed shortly after by "Tracy Lacy for Class Captain" in 2017.

== Credits ==
=== Television ===
Year	Title	Role	Type
1987–1989	The Factory	Host / Roving reporter	TV series
1989–1990	Countdown Revolution	Host / Roving reporter	TV series
1990–1995	Tonight Live	Live Linx / Comedian	TV series
1990–1995	Hey Hey It's Saturday	Comedian	TV series
1992	Saturday at Rick's	Presenter / Roving reporter / Sketchwork	TV series
	The Today Show	Roving reporter / Sketchwork	TV series
	The Midday Show	Roving reporter / Sketchwork	TV series
	Sex	Reporter	TV series
	A Current Affair	Comedy reporter	TV series
	Good Morning Australia	Reporter	TV series
	The Pitch	Presenter	TV series
	E! Entertainment (pilot)	Presenter	Imagination Films
	Battle of the Sexes	Regular guest	TV series
	Dilemma	Guest	TV series
1997	The Adventures of Lano and Woodley	Melanie, con artist	TV series, 1 episode
1997–1998	Australian Good Taste	Presenter	TV series, segment: "In Your Fridge"
1997; 1998	Raw FM	Laetitia	TV series, 2 episodes
1998	Totally Full Frontal	Guest	TV series, 2 episodes
1998	Home & Hosed	Guest	TV series, episode 1
1999	Pig's Breakfast	Rebecca	TV series, season 1, episode 23: "Face Off"
1999–2000	High Flyers	Robyn Kettrick	TV series
2001	The Big Schmooze	Self	TV series
2002	The Fat	Self	TV series
2006–2007	Girl Friday	Miss Mann	Web series
2007	Neighbours	Barrister Catherine Michael	TV series, 3 episodes
2008	Artscape: IOU	Guest	TV series, episode 1: "Mary Hardy"
2014	The Feed	Self	TV documentary, 1 episode

==== As writer ====
Year	Title	Role	Type
2008	G2G: Got to Go	Contributing Writer / Comedy Editor	Animated TV series
2010	Sumo Mouse	Script Editor / Continuing Writer	Animated TV series, 5 episodes
2012	SheZow	Writer	Animated TV series, 1 episode
2012	Flea-bitten	Writer	Animated TV series, 1 episode
2013–2014	Jar Dwellers	Writer	Animated TV series, 2 episodes
2016–2017	Kuu Kuu Harajuku	Writer	Animated TV series, 4 episodes

=== Film ===
Year	Title	Role	Type
1990	A Date With Destiny	Queen of Mars	Short film
1991	A Slow Night at the Kuwaiti Cafe	Bathsheba	Direct-to-video feature film
1997	Titsiana Booberini	Titsiana	Short film (also co-writer)
1997	Pussy Got Your Tongue	Kitty	Short film (also writer); Won Nicole Kidman Best Actress Award at Tropfest
1998	Thump	Natalie	Short film
1998	Tangerine Dream	Bonnie	Short film
1999	Accidents Will Happen	Kylie Manson	
1999	Jesus is Lord	Dallas	Short film (also writer/director); Finalist at Melbourne International Comedy Film Festival
2012	10 Terrorists	Command Sergeant Major Stevens	Feature film
2012	The Man Who Could Not Dream	Samuel's mother	Short film

==== As writer ====
Year	Title	Role	Type
1997	Titsiana Booberini	Co-writer	Short film
1997	Pussy Got Your Tongue	Writer	Short film
1999	Jesus is Lord	Writer / Director	Short film
TBA	Virtually Kitty	Writer	Film

=== Stage ===
Year	Title	Role	Type
1993	Could I Have This Dance	Monica	Melbourne Athenaeum with Mystic Productions
1993; 1994; 1995	Behind the Play	Tina	The Courthouse, Melbourne & Barassis Mountain View Hotel with Linking Images Productions
1994	All of Me	One-woman show	Melbourne Town Hall for Melbourne International Comedy Festival / Sydney / Brisbane / Edinburgh Comedy Festival (also playwright)
1994	The Truth Game	Wendy Pierce	The Courthouse, Melbourne
1996	Jesus is Lord	Comedian	Melbourne International Comedy Festival
1997	Princess Smartypants / Cupid	Various roles	Victoria Arts Centre
1998	Twelfth Night	Fabian	Playhouse, Melbourne with MTC
2000	Suburban Refugee	One-woman show	Theatre Theater, Hollywood, LA (also creator)
2002	CooCoo Bananas	One-woman show	Melbourne International Comedy Festival (also creator)
2021	Catch a Falling Star	Comedian	Edinburgh Fringe
2023	Tania Lacy: Everything's Coming Up Roses	Comedian	Adelaide Fringe, North Australian Festival of the Arts, Townsville, Campari House for Melbourne International Comedy Festival, Factory Theatre for Sydney Comedy Festival, Cairns, Just the Tonic at The Caves, Edinburgh

=== TVC ===
Year	Brand
1989	Players Biscuits
1990	BHP
2000	Ford

== Awards ==
Year	Work	Award	Category	Result
1995	All of Me	Edinburgh Comedy Awards	Perrier Award	Nominated
1995	All of Me	Edinburgh Comedy Awards	Best Newcomer Award	Nominated
1997	Titsiana Booberini	Exposure Film Festival, Brisbane	Best Actress Award	Won
1997	Pussy Got Your Tongue?	Tropfest	Nicole Kidman Best Actress Award	Won
1996	Jesus is Lord	Melbourne International Comedy Festival		Nominated

== Personal life ==
After she was fired from Countdown Revolution in 1990, Lacy's career came to a standstill and she turned to heroin and alcohol. She underwent a stint in rehab in 1994, and was also diagnosed with Bipolar disorder. However, after her diagnosis, she began writing scripts and developing new characters.

Lacy met her future husband, German motion graphics designer Ole Sturm in Los Angeles in 2000. She was performing in her one-woman show, Suburban Refugee, and he was working on Mission: Impossible 2. They were married in the Hollywood Hills in November 2000 and then returned to Melbourne, where their son, Per, was born in December 2005.

In 2008, when Per was three, Lacy was diagnosed with Borderline personality disorder.

Lacy and Sturm moved to Berlin, Germany, and after six years, returned to Australia, mid-COVID-19 pandemic, settling in Cairns, far north Queensland.

Lacy started studying law after she moved to Cairns.

== Legal issues and controversies ==
The much-lauded short film Titsiana Booberini was the source of a bitter legal case over authorship between Lacy, director Robert Luketic (who went on to direct Legally Blonde) and Miramax. Lacy claims she wrote the film and created the character of Titsiana, but Luketic claims he wrote it. Lacy says she turned down the offer of a settlement from Miramax, demanding instead to be credited as writer and creator. The dispute remains unresolved.

A segment of The Factory that never went to air had Lacy and her film crew dressed up as Mick Hucknall from Simply Red and attempt to get backstage at the band's concert. They made it through security and wandered around until they passed Mick himself – who had them ejected and threatened to sue the ABC, who were forced to issue a public apology.
