= Heathmont Baseball Club =

- Logo

Information
- League: Melbourne Winter Baseball League (A grade, C Grade)
- Location: Heathmont, Victoria
- Ballpark: Heathmont Reserve
- Founded: 1969
- Colors: Black and Grey

Current uniforms
Current	Former

The Heathmont Baseball Club, known as the Penguins, is a baseball Club based in the outer Melbourne Suburb of Heathmont. The club was formed in 1969 and has competed in the Melbourne Winter Baseball League and Ringwood District Baseball League since.

Current Atlanta Braves pitcher Peter Moylan played for Heathmont before his Major League Baseball debut.

== History ==
The Heathmont Baseball Club was formed in 1969, Since that time the club has played at Heathmont Reserve in Heathmont, Victoria. The club has won A grade premierships in 1980, 1992, 1993, 2012 and 2013. The club has won B grade premierships in 1969 and 1991. Predominantly a competing winter baseball club with 6 senior teams from A grade to E grade and junior teams catering for players from 9 years old to 17 years old, Heathmont Baseball Club also competes during the summer months with Masters (over 38) and junior baseball teams, including tee-ball programs. Many Australian and International representative players have played for Heathmont since the club was formed.
