= Killers (2010 film) =

- Theatrical release poster
- Directed by: Robert Luketic
- Screenplay by: Bob DeRosa; Ted Griffin
- Story by: Bob DeRosa
- Produced by: Scott Aversano; Jason Goldberg; Mike Karz; Ashton Kutcher; Chad Marting; Christopher S. Pratt; Josie Rosen
- Starring: Ashton Kutcher; Katherine Heigl; Tom Selleck; Catherine O'Hara
- Cinematography: Russell Carpenter
- Edited by: Mary Jo Markey; Richard Francis-Bruce
- Music by: Rolfe Kent
- Production companies: Katalyst Media; Aversand Films
- Distributed by: Lionsgate
- Release dates: June 1, 2010 (Hollywood); June 4, 2010 (United States)
- Running time: 100 minutes
- Country: United States
- Language: English
- Budget: $75 million
- Box office: $98.2 million

Killers is a 2010 American action comedy film directed by Robert Luketic and starring Katherine Heigl and Ashton Kutcher. The film centers on a young woman (Heigl) who meets the man of her dreams (Kutcher) who turns out to be an assassin. The film was theatrically released on June 4, 2010. It was panned by critics and only grossed $98.2 million worldwide against its $75 million budget.

== Plot ==
A woman named Jen Kornfeldt travels to Nice, France, with her parents after a break-up. She meets a man named Spencer Aimes and agrees to join him later for drinks. He sneaks aboard a boat, planting a bomb on a helicopter, then arrives for his date with Jen. When the helicopter takes off, Spencer triggers the bomb.

After a night of drinking, Spencer reveals he is a professional assassin, unaware that Jen has fallen asleep. Despite his boss Holbrook's objections, Spencer quits contract killing and begins a relationship with Jen. He eventually asks her father Mr. Kornfeldt for his blessing to marry her.

Three years later, Spencer and Jen have settled into married life. When she surprises him with tickets to Nice for his birthday, he is less than enthusiastic, which Jen's friends convince her is a sign he is bored with their relationship. Spencer receives a "romantic" postcard from Holbrook with an ultimatum to take another assignment.

Trying to refuse the job over the phone, Spencer hangs up when Jen's father arrives, prompting suspicion; he also notices the postcard. Mr. Kornfeldt brings Spencer to a surprise birthday party, where the latter's distraction over the assignment strengthens Jen's doubts about his commitment. This is further fueled in the morning when he rushes Jen off on her business trip.

Jen decides to return home and finds Spencer fighting off his best friend Henry, secretly a fellow assassin, who reveals a $20 million bounty has been placed on Spencer and that anyone in his life could be an assassin. A sniper opens fire on the house, and Spencer and Jen flee. They lead Henry on a car chase through the neighborhood and flip his car onto rebar, killing him.

After the couple find Holbrook dead in his hotel room, Jen vomits and realizes she might be pregnant. At Spencer's office, she takes a pregnancy test, while he is attacked by his secretary, Vivian. But Spencer, with Jen's help, manages to kill her. Jen's test is positive, and despite Spencer's pleas, she drives off alone.

Spencer is attacked by a delivery driver, who is run over and killed by one of Spencer's co-workers, Olivia. She then tries to run him over, but Jen returns and rams Olivia's car into a fuel tank, which Spencer shoots. The car explodes, killing Olivia in the process.

Spencer and Jen discuss their future together and return home, evading next door neighbors Mac and Lily, who are also assassins. Making their way through the neighbourhood block party, they enter the house to retrieve Spencer's bug-out bag. Spencer subdues the neighbours, while Jen's best friend Kristen, yet another assassin, holds Jen's mother hostage in a Mexican standoff with Jen.

Jen's father arrives and kills Kristen. In a standoff with Spencer, he reveals that he ordered the hit. Aware of Spencer's career all along, Mr. Kornfeldt explains that he was a former operative himself and had been Spencer's target in Nice; he embedded the assassins in Spencer and Jen's lives. The postcard from Holbrook led Mr. Kornfeldt to believe that Spencer had resumed his old job, so he activated the assassins.

To prove he has truly left his old profession behind, Spencer drops his gun, assuring Mr. Kornfeldt he has no intention of killing him. Jen, now convinced, reveals her pregnancy to her parents. Her father, after killing one last assassin, drops his gun as well, and the family makes peace by building a trust circle.

Months later, Spencer – growing a moustache to emulate Mr. Kornfeldt – and Jen leave her parents babysitting their baby boy, guarded by lasers.

== Cast ==
- Ashton Kutcher as Spencer Aimes
- Katherine Heigl as Jen Kornfeldt
- Tom Selleck as Mr. Kornfeldt
- Catherine O'Hara as Mrs. Kornfeldt
- Katheryn Winnick as Vivian
- Kevin Sussman as Mac Bailey
- Lisa Ann Walter as Olivia Brooks
- Casey Wilson as Kristen
- Rob Riggle as Henry
- Martin Mull as Holbrook
- Alex Borstein as Lily Bailey
- Larry Joe Campbell as Pete Denham

In addition, Usher (credited with his full name, Usher Raymond IV) has a cameo as Kevin, the K Mart manager, while Mary Birdsong briefly appears as Jackie, Jen and Spencer's obnoxious next door neighbor.

== Production ==
Originally announced in September 2007 under the title Five Killers, the film was written by Bob DeRosa as an action thriller to be directed by Mark Helfrich. Ashton Kutcher was cast in the lead in October 2008, with Robert Luketic directing instead of Helfrich and reformatted as an action-comedy rather than an action thriller in a rewrite by Ted Griffin. Katherine Heigl joined the cast in February 2009 playing opposite Kutcher. Filming began in the fall of 2009 and took place in the Tributary community in Douglasville, Georgia, Nassau and Villefranche-sur-Mer doubling for Nice.

== Home media ==
The DVD and Blu-ray of the film was released on September 7, 2010.

== Reception ==
On Rotten Tomatoes, the film has an approval rating of 10% based on 108 reviews, and an average rating of 3.4/10. The site's critics consensus reads: "Dull, formulaic, and chemistry-free, Killers is an action/comedy that's largely bereft of thrills or laughs." On Metacritic, the film has a weighted average score of 21 out of 100 based on 22 critics, indicating "generally unfavorable" reviews. Audiences polled by CinemaScore gave the film an average grade of "B" on an A+ to F scale.

Rob Nelson of Variety wrote: "Bullets fly and jokes land with a thud in Killers, a deadly dull hubby's-a-hit man farce that alternately resembles a knockoff of 2005's Mr. and Mrs. Smith and a rehash of Knight & Day avant la lettre." Jeannette Catsoulis of The New York Times warned "Unless you're trapped on an airplane or enjoying movie night at the penitentiary, you have no excuse for watching Killers. A brain-deadening collision of high concept and low standards."

Ashton Kutcher won the Golden Raspberry Award for Worst Actor for his performance in the film (also for Valentine's Day).

=== Box office ===
The film debuted at #3 at the box office behind Shrek Forever After and Get Him to the Greek, with $15.8 million in its opening weekend. Against its budget of $75 million, Killers took in $47 million in the United States, and $51.1 million in other territories, the film grossed $98.2 million worldwide.
