= Tributary (disambiguation) =

Tributary may refer to the following:

- Tributary, a stream or river which flows into another river (a parent river) or body of water but which may not flow directly into the sea
- Tributary (ballet) by Robert La Fosse and Robert Garland, 2000
- Tributary, Georgia, an unincorporated community in Douglas County
- Tributary state
