= Titsiana Booberini =

- Directed by: Robert Luketic
- Written by: Tania Lacy
- Starring: Tania Lacy; Sophie Lee; Roz Hammond
- Release date: July 31, 1997
- Running time: 12 minutes
- Country: Australia
- Language: English

Titsiana Booberini is a 1997 Australian short film directed by Robert Luketic, written by and starring Tania Lacy, also starring Sophie Lee, and Roz Hammond.

== Premise ==
The film is a musical comedy, with the story focusing on Titsiana Booberini, an Italian check-out girl at a suburban supermarket who is ridiculed by her fellow employees for her slightly hirsute upper lip. Titsiana gains new confidence and acceptance when she discovers a hair removal treatment.

== Reception ==
Initially entered at the Telluride Film Festival and the Sundance Film Festival, the film's success led to it being screened at film festivals all over the world. It won "Best Film" at the Aspen Shortsfest, and lead actress Tania Lacy's performance won her the "Best Actress Award" at the Exposure Film Festival in Brisbane. Its positive reception at Sundance caught the interest of several high-profile studios, leading to Luketic being offered the directing position for Legally Blonde. At one point in 1998, there were plans to make a full-length version with Miramax.

== Cast ==
- Tania Lacy - Titsiana Booberini
- Sophie Lee - Francine Pickles
- Roz Hammond - Carol Johnson
- David J. Berman - Chubus Zarbo
- Marc Savoia - Stock boy
