= The Factory (Australian TV series) =

Australian television series (1987–1989)

The Factory is an Australian television program that was broadcast on ABC TV on Saturday mornings, from 1987 to 1989. The Factory was hosted by Andrew Daddo and Alex Papps.

Created to fill the void left by the demise of the music show Countdown, The Factory featured music videos, studio performances, and interviews but also extended the format to include comedy sketches and magazine segments covering topics such as fashion, movies and other pop culture. Reporters included Tania Lacy and Karen Leng.

== See also ==
- List of Australian music television shows
- List of Australian television series
- List of Australian music television shows
- List of programs broadcast by ABC (Australian TV network)
