= Heathmont Bowls Club =

- Founded: 1957
- Colors: Blue Yellow
- Chairman: Stephen Dare
- Affiliation(s): Bowls Victoria
- Website: http://www.heathmontbowls.com.au

Heathmont Bowls Club is a lawn bowls club founded in 1957 and situated in the outer Eastern Melbourne suburb of Heathmont, adjacent to HE Parker Reserve and the Dandenong Creek Trail. The club is affiliated with Bowls Victoria and plays in the Eastern Ranges bowls region.

== History ==
=== Foundation ===
The establishment of the club was conceived by Jim O'Brien, Jack Egan and Clarrie Beard J.P., who met regularly at Daisy's Ringwood East Hotel. Realising that Heathmont was a very "dry" (non-alcoholic) area, they consequently decided to form a club and to apply for a liquor licence.

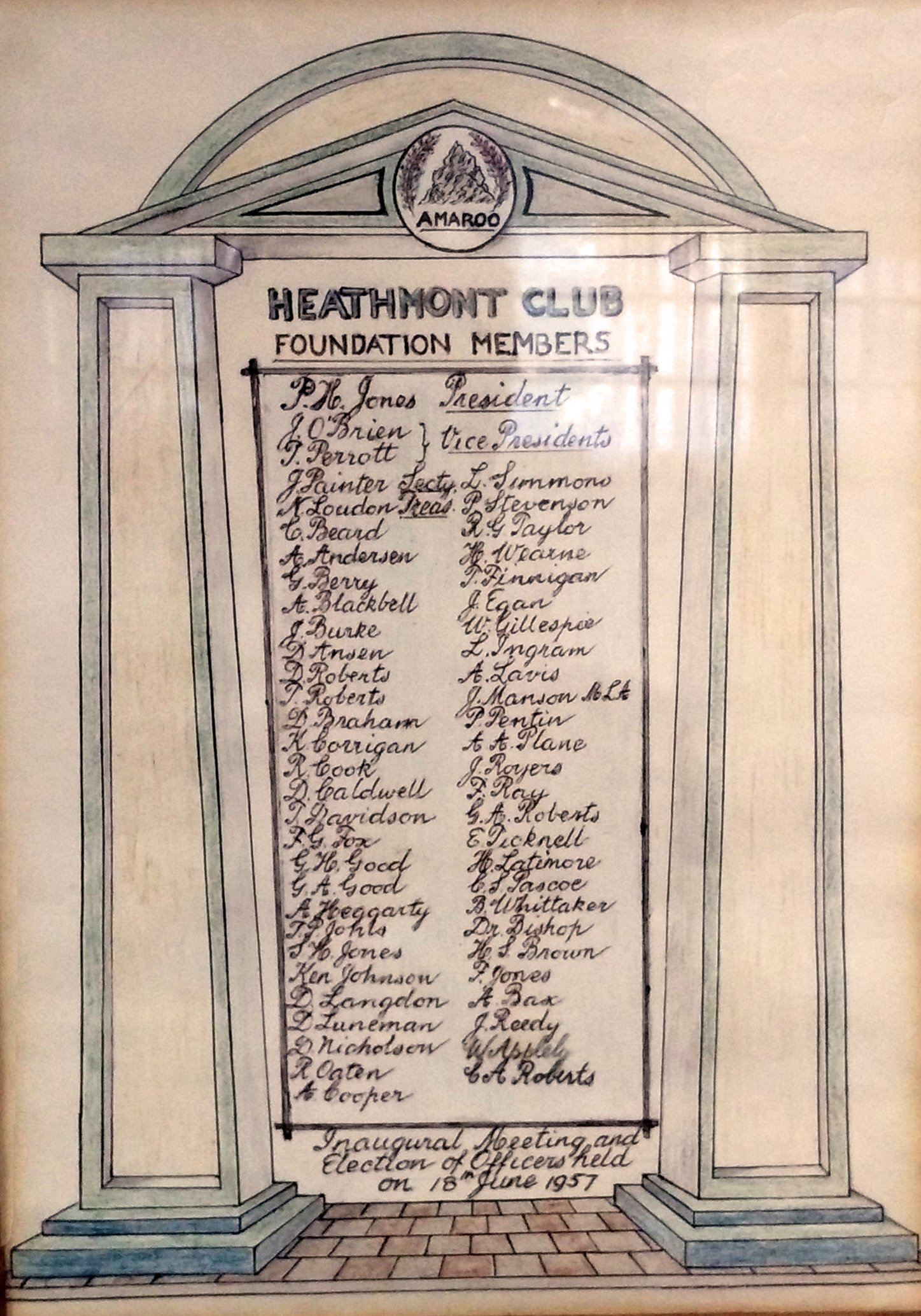
Founding members of Heathmont Club

On 18 June 1957, a meeting took place at Jim O'Brien's home. The focus of that meeting was to buy local land and to set up a social and sporting club to serve the needs of men from Heathmont and surrounding districts. Jim O'Brien, Jack Egan and Phil Jones successfully purchased three acres of land in Heathmont for £3,000 for the development of the club.

A committee of six members, from the 56 foundation members, was then formed to run what was then known as the Heathmont Club. Phil Jones was elected as President, Jim O'Brien and Tom Perrott as vice-presidents, John Painter as secretary and Norm Loudon as treasurer.

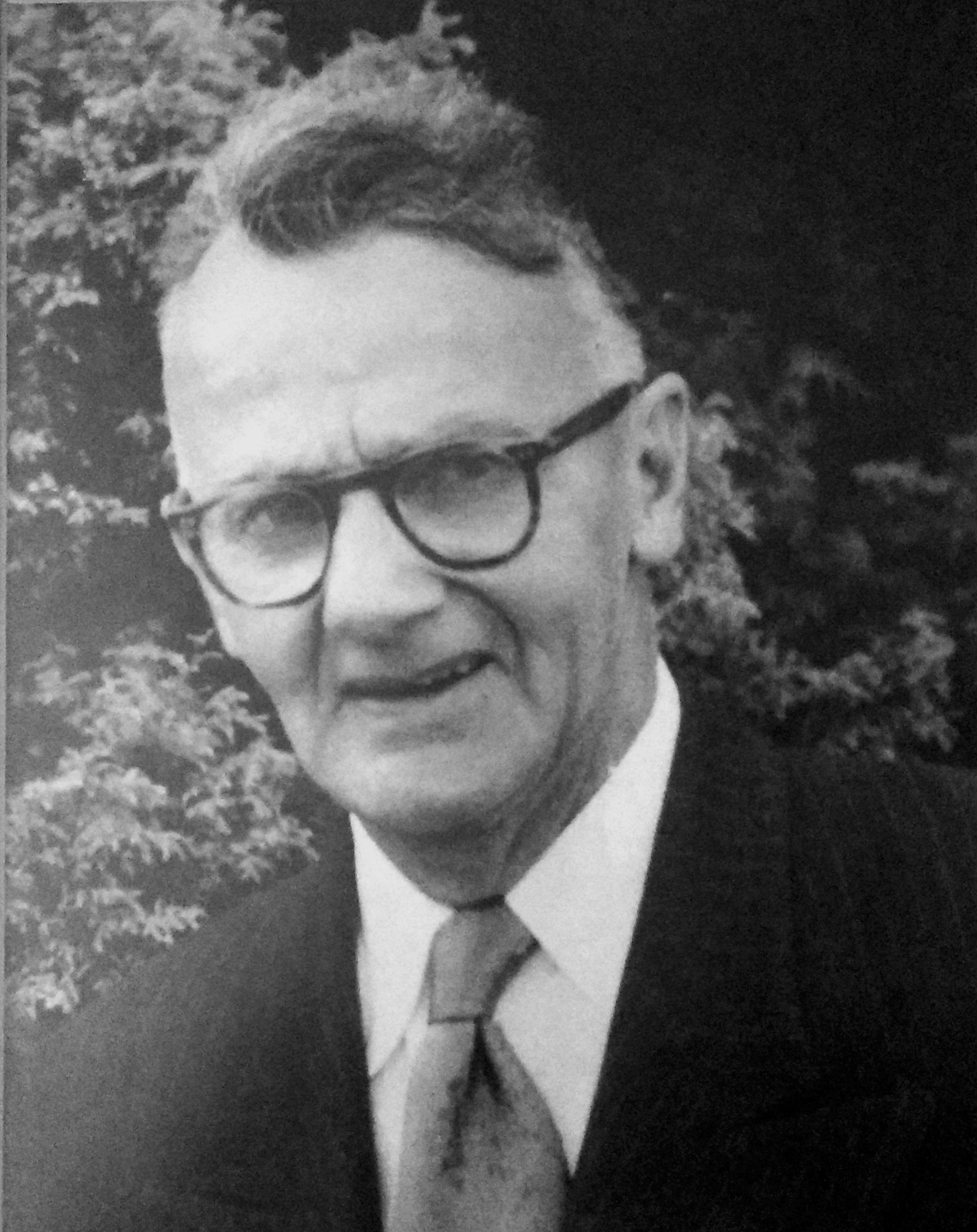
PH Jones – inaugural president of Heathmont Club

The original objectives of the club were to provide bowling greens, tennis courts, squash courts, table tennis, billiards, darts, angling and other sporting activities.

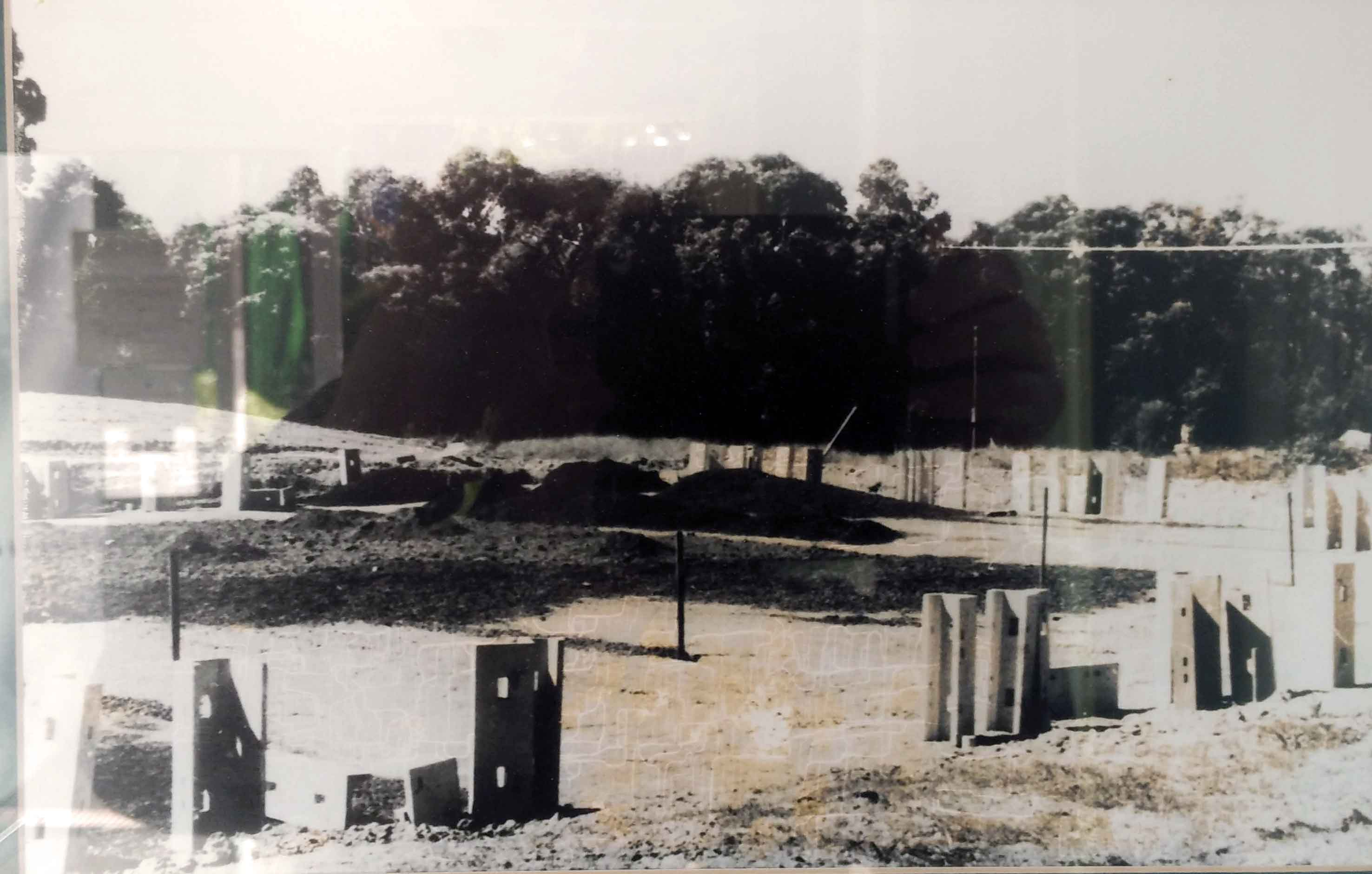
Heathmont Bowls Club Green No 1 Construction

The club was incorporated under the companies act on 26 August 1958. The inaugural AGM was held in November 1959, at which it was decided that the commencement of bowling green number one would begin immediately. The green was completed and ready for the 1960/61 season.

The official opening of the first green and clubhouse was performed by Royal Victorian Bowls Association vice-president David Klein, and Ringwood State Member JW Manson MLA, on Saturday 17 September 1960.

One competition side was formed that year and the first game, played at home to Sassafras on 8 October 1960 was cancelled due to inclement weather conditions.

In 1960 foundation member, Bill Gillespie, won the club's first championship.

In the first year the Club won 38 trophies.

=== Early years (1962–1972) ===
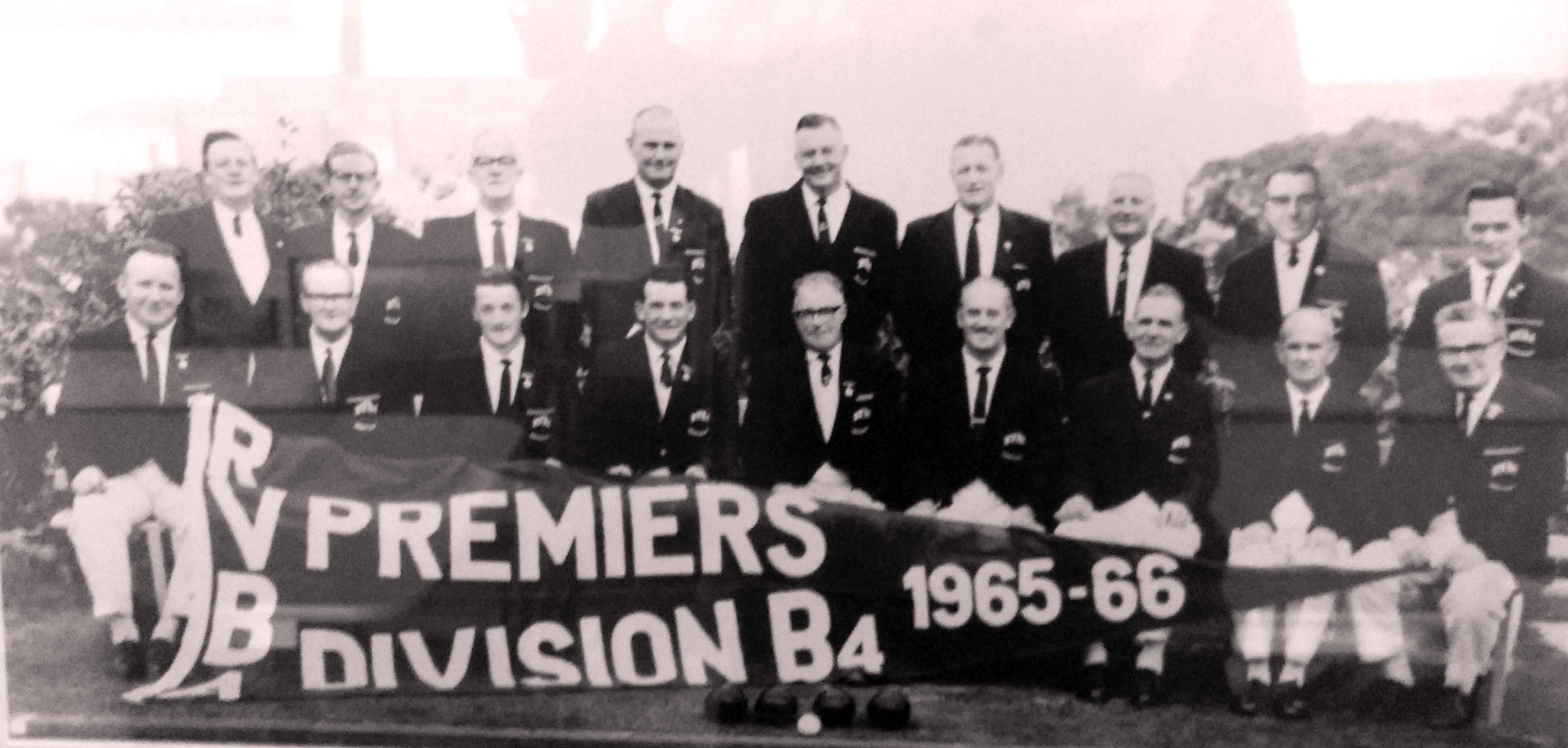
Heathmont Bowls Club men's team 1965–66

In 1962 the club's second green was completed, a liquor licence was granted for the sale of canned and bottled beer only, railway lines were purchased from VicRail to support electric lights over the first green and a four-foot chimney and fireplace was built into the West wall of the club house.

In the 1966–67 season the club's ladies team won their first pennant.

In 1972 the club's third green was completed.

=== 1973–1983 ===
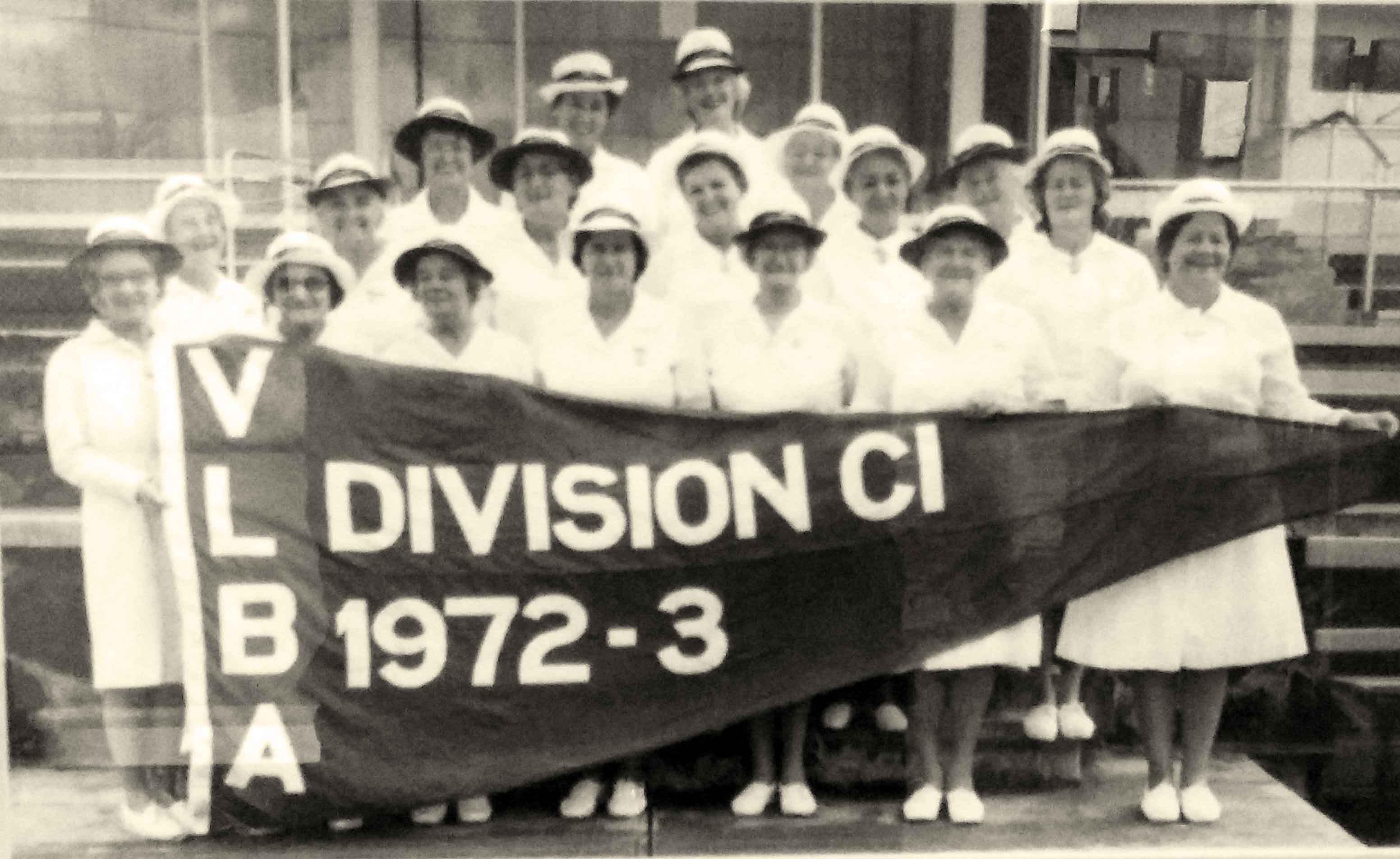
Heathmont Bowls Club Ladies Team 1972–73

In 1975 a brick building extension was added to the west-side of the club house, with the addition of a new bar and lounge.

In 1977 the road to the club – the Greenway road – was laid at a cost of $31,000. The club house kitchen was renovated with the addition of a Carmichael gas stove and oven costing $9,000.

In 1978 the club fielded nine men's and six lady's teams in pennant competition. The car park was asphalted and ducted heating was installed in the club house.

In 1979 the club membership was 456.

In 1983 the men's team won their first Royal Victorian Bowls Association pennant flag in Division 2.

=== 1984–present day ===
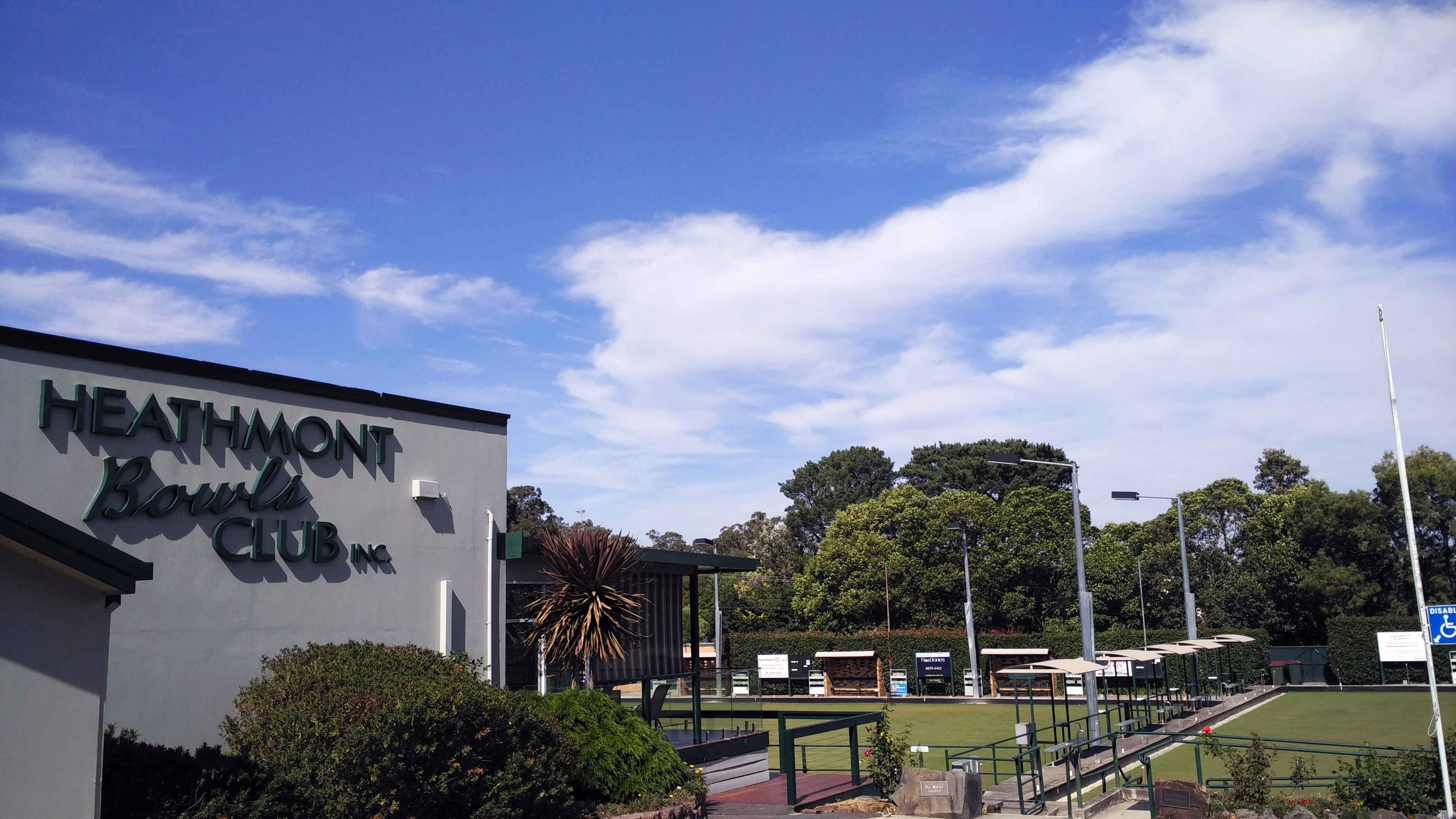
Heathmont Bowls Club

In 1985 the club celebrated its 25th birthday – since the first green was opened in 1960 – and had 437 members. A brick extension was added to the east side of the clubhouse and was named the Ken Lucas Wing.

In 1986 an "alleged deficiency" was reported at the AGM of the club. After an inquiry this was "unable to be proved by goods nor cash".

In 1989 Ken Wood Bradley, State Fours tile holder and state representative, joined the club and expressed a desire that they build a stadium on the grounds.

In 1994 the third green converted to a synthetic surface.

In 2005, the club's green keeper was named "Greenkeeper of the Year".

Today the club has three greens and a modern bar and function venue serving the local community.

== Club symbols and identity ==
The crest of the club features a mountain, representing the panoramic views from the greens of nearby Mount Dandenong and the Dandenong Ranges, as well the motto "Amaroo". Amaroo is an aboriginal Australian word for a "pretty place".

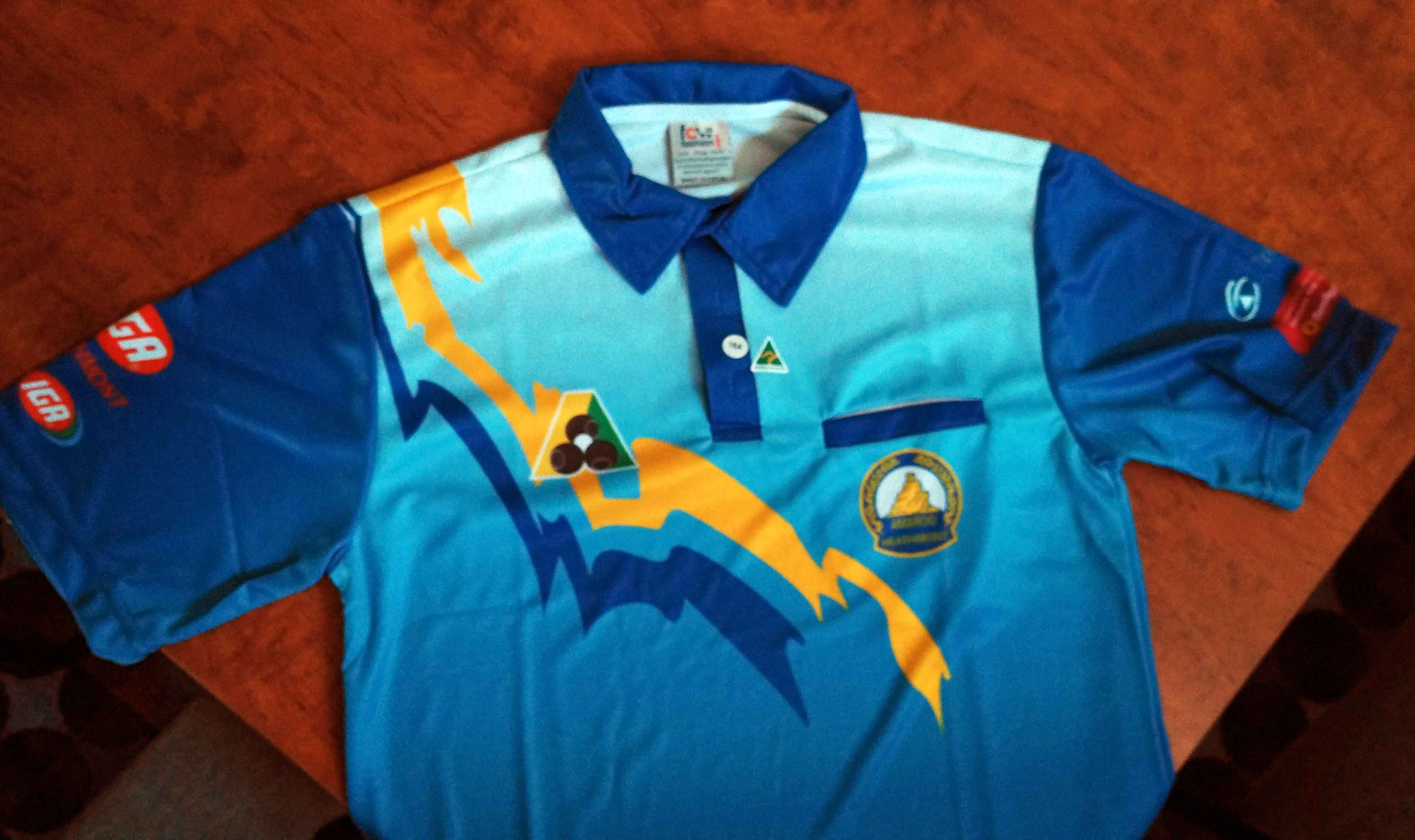
Heathmont Bowls Club Shirt

== Honours ==
On 1 April 1989, David Tebbet of the Club won the Under 40s Classic Pairs Championship.

The club won the Victorian Lawn Bowls Association A1 Pennant final in 1990.

In April 2016, two members of Heathmont Bowls Club became Victorian State Mens Pairs Champions.

In April 2005, John strybosch won the Group and State over 60s singles championship.
