= Boss of the Pool =

1986 play written by Robin Klein and play adaptation by Mary Morris

Boss of the Pool is a children's book by Australian author Robin Klein and also is the name of a play adaptation by Scottish-Australian playwright Mary Morris. The story follows a teenage girl called Shelley, who must accompany her mother to work in the summer holidays as her mother has no other way of minding her. Her mother works at a hostel for people with disabilities, and Shelley meets a boy called Ben, who really likes her, but is afraid of water. Shelley helps teach Ben to overcome his fear of the water.

== Book ==
Boss of the Pool
- First edition
- Author: Robin Klein
- Language: English
- Genre: Book
- Publisher: Omnibus in association with Penguin
- Publication date: 1986

The book was published in 1986. It addresses topics of disabilities and literacy and is discussed in numerous works about those topics.

Kirkus gave it a starred review: "This is an extraordinary book in honestly depicting the fear and cruel taunts that are common and perhaps natural in children who confront people who are different before they understand their humanity." Another reviewer puts it among contemporary junior novels comparable to Beverly Cleary's classic Henry Huggins and Ramona Quimby books, as involving conflict in the youthful protagonist who, like the reader, is struggling to establish their own autonomy.

Susanne Gervay cites the book as an example of "children's and youth literature becoming more confronting and realistic", addressing a range of conditions "either as a primary or more frequently as a secondary theme", along with Two Weeks with The Queen (1989) by Morris Gleitzman, which addresses AIDS and cancer. She notes Boss of the Pool (1986) "sensitively" tackles "intellectual disabilities and learning difficulties". By contrast, the reviewer for the School Library Journal noted that Shelley was an unsympathetic character, and described the book as "just too dreary to be enjoyable". By contrast, the reviewer for the Canberra Times felt that Shelley's emotional growth was depicted well, although they described the novel as "slightly didactic".

Jenny Kendrick describes it as one of a number of "books in which the character with learning difficulties is not allowed to evolve at all, and is merely a vehicle for the development of the other child or children". Some of these are books in which "the young characters with learning difficulties...are not only the sketchiest of stereotypes, but demonised as well", but Boss of the Pool, as well as Elizabeth Laird's Red Sky is "a 'caring' narrative": Boss of the Pool is a book "in which the focaliser becomes a better person because of his or her circumstances, although the catalyst could indeed have been any crisis, since the character with learning difficulties is only superficially presented."

At least two teaching guides for using the book have been published.

=== Honors ===
The National Library of New Zealand includes it in their list of "classics" of "young fiction".

The book is listed in the KOALA (Kids Own Australian Literature Awards) Hall of Fame.

== Play ==
Boss of the Pool
- Author: Mary Morris
- Language: English
- Genre: Play
- Publisher: Currency Press
- Publication date: 1993
- Publication place: Australia
- Media type: Print (Paperback)
- ISBN: 978-0-86819-355-7

Boss of the Pool is also a play by Scottish-Australian playwright Mary Morris. It was adapted from the novel of the same name, by Robin Klein.

=== Plot ===
Shelley is embarrassed when her mother starts working at the ‘retard farm’. Why can't she get a decent job? At the pool, Ben is afraid of the water, but persists in hanging around the edge, and Tania in the wheelchair is organising a disco.

=== Productions ===
Boss of the Pool, the play, was first performed by Acting Out on 7 July 1990 at the Playhouse Theatre, Perth, and has been performed and reviewed a number of times since.

=== Other ===
Material from the play has also been used in a study of information literacy in Australian youth.
