= Robert Luketic =

Australian film director (born 1973)

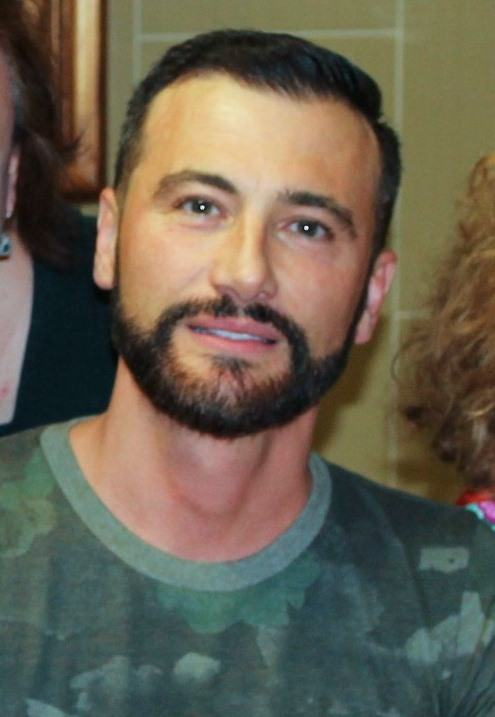
- Luketic in 2016
- Born: August 14, 1971 (age 55); Sydney, New South Wales, Australia
- Occupations: Film director, producer, screenwriter
- Years active: 1997–present

Robert Luketic (Croatian: Luketić) is an Australian film director. His films include Legally Blonde (2001), Monster-in-Law (2005), 21 (2008), Killers (2010), and Paranoia (2013).

== Early life and education ==
Robert Luketic was born in Sydney, Australia on August 14, 1971, as the elder of two children of a Croatian father and Italian mother. He has a younger sister called Marie.

Luketic started making short films as a teenager and went on to study at the Victorian College of Arts – School of Film and Television (VCA).

== Career ==
He first attracted Hollywood's attention with his award-winning short film Titsiana Booberini written by Tania Lacy. After screening to much acclaim at several festivals within Australia, Titsiana Booberini became a hit at many internationally renowned festivals including the Sundance Film Festival. It won "Best Film" at the Aspen Shortsfest.

Luketic directed the comedy Legally Blonde for MGM in the summer of 2001. This film, which grossed close to $100 million domestically and was nominated for two Golden Globe Awards, marked Luketic's feature film directing debut.

Next, Luketic directed the DreamWorks Pictures film Win a Date with Tad Hamilton!. The 2003 film, produced by Doug Wick and Lucy Fisher at Red Wagon, stars Kate Bosworth, Nathan Lane, Josh Duhamel and Topher Grace. In 2005, he directed Monster-in-Law, starring Jennifer Lopez, Jane Fonda, and Michael Vartan. At one point, Luketic was attached to direct an adaptation of Donald Hamilton's Matt Helm books as his followup to Monster-in-Law. He was later attached to direct a feature film adaptation of the TV series Dallas.

In 2008, Luketic released 21, based on the book Bringing Down the House by Ben Mezrich. The film tells the true story of five MIT students who became experts at counting cards and subsequently took Vegas casinos for millions in winnings. The film stars Kevin Spacey, Kate Bosworth, Jim Sturgess, and Laurence Fishburne.

He directed the romantic comedy The Ugly Truth, which opened in July 2009. Starring Katherine Heigl and Gerard Butler, the film follows a morning show producer (Heigl) who sets out to disprove the outrageous relationship theories of her chauvinistic correspondent (Butler). Luketic next directed the action-comedy Killers, starring Heigl and Ashton Kutcher.

In August 2024, it was announced that Luketic is set to direct All Out of Love: The Air Supply Story (a biopic about the Australian band Air Supply), for Altit Media Group.

== Personal life ==
Luketic is openly gay.

== Filmography ==
Short film

- Titsiana Booberini (1997)

Feature film

- Legally Blonde (2001)
- Win a Date with Tad Hamilton! (2004)
- Monster-in-Law (2005)
- 21 (2008)
- The Ugly Truth (2009)
- Killers (2010)
- Paranoia (2013)
- The Wedding Year (2019)

Television

Year	Title	Episode(s)
2006	Women in Law	"Pilot"
2015	Jane the Virgin	"Chapter Nineteen"
2015	Jane the Virgin	"Chapter Twenty-Five"
2021	The Baby-Sitters Club	"Kristy and the Snobs"
2021	The Baby-Sitters Club	"Claudia and the New Girl"
2021	The Baby-Sitters Club	"Jessi and the Superbrat"
2021	The Baby-Sitters Club	"Claudia and the Sad Goodbye"
2023	Schmigadoon!	"Famous as Hell"
2023	Schmigadoon!	"Over and Done"
