= Mighty Big Crime =

Hip-Hop Duo

- Origin: Melbourne, Victoria, Australia
- Genres: Hip hop
- Years active: 1986–1991
- Labels: Criteria/Virgin
- Past members: Gumpy; Tricky J

Mighty Big Crime were an early Australian hip hop duo, formed in 1986 by Tricky J (Julien Lodge) and Gumpy (A Phillips). They released one of the first hip hop recordings in that country with "16 Tons" (1987), a cover version of Merle Travis' country music song, "Sixteen Tons". Their debut album, Get Outta My Face, appeared in April 1989. By 1991 both were members of a flower power group, Freaked Out Flower Children.

== History ==
Mighty Big Crime were an Australian hip hop duo formed by Tricky J (Julien Lodge) and Gumpy (A Phillips) (ex-Battle Happy) in 1986 in Melbourne. According to British record producer, David Courtney, he saw the pair MCing at an early performance in a pub, he got them signed to Virgin Records and provided their name. In 1987 they issued one of the first hip hop recordings in Australia, "16 Tons" and "Humber Mania Time". "16 Tons" is a rap cover version of Merle Travis' country song, "Sixteen Tons". "Humber Mania Time" was co-written by Lodge and Phillips; both tracks were recorded at Metropolis Studios and Pig Pen Studios, Melbourne with Courtney, and John Phillips producing. From March to July 1987 Tricky J also worked as a member of I'm Talking.

Michael Wellham of The Canberra Times described "16 Tons", "after listening to this it seems hard to believe that no one thought of doing a rap version of [it] before, no song was more deserving of the treatment. When you think about it Australia has been absolutely crying out for some rap artists of its own, and is now in the position where it can sigh with relief as the void is filled." Wellham's colleague, Stuart Coupe, reviewed Australian rap and hip hop in June 1988. He observed that Mighty Big Crime are, "the first Australians to make a record in this style... who seem to fancy themselves as the southern hemisphere's version of the Beastie Boys."

That single and its follow up, was a cover of Alice Cooper's "Schools Out". Their music video for "Dr. Dynamite" (1990) was nominated for ARIA Award for Best Video at the ARIA Music Awards of 1991. From 1991 to 1993 both Gumpy, on guitar and vocals, and Tricky J, on synthesiser, were members of Freaked Out Flower Children.

== Members ==
- Gumpy (Andrew Phillips) – MC, guitar, vocals
- Tricky J (Julien Lodge) – MC, synthesiser

== Discography ==
=== Singles ===
| Year | Title | Peak chart positions |
| Year | Title | AUS |
|---|---|---|
| 1987 | "16 Tons" | - |
| 1988 | "Outta My Face" | - |
| 1988 | "Schools Out"/"2 Quick Too Catch" | - |
| 1990 | "Dr. Dynamite" | 121 |
| 1991 | "Sugar Daddy" | 135 |
