= Hating Alison Ashley (film) =

- DVD cover for Hating Alison Ashley
- Directed by: Geoff Bennett
- Screenplay by: Christine Madafferi
- Based on: Hating Alison Ashley by Robin Klein
- Produced by: John Brousek and Elizabeth Howatt-Jackman
- Starring: Delta Goodrem; Saskia Burmeister; Tracy Mann; Richard Carter; Rachael Carpani; Craig McLachlan
- Cinematography: Steve Newman
- Edited by: Suresh Ayyar
- Music by: Cezary Skubiszewski
- Release date: 17 March 2005
- Running time: 100 minutes
- Country: Australia
- Language: English

Hating Alison Ashley is a 2005 Australian comedy film based on the 1984 novel Hating Alison Ashley. Produced by Elizabeth Howatt-Jackman and directed by Geoff Bennett, the film stars Saskia Burmeister as Erica "Yuk" Yurken, an adolescent brunette who fantasises about a better life and acting stardom; and Delta Goodrem as her intelligent school rival Alison Ashley. Erica at first is desperate to be Alison's friend but soon changes her mind due to her jealousy, where she belligerently sees Alison as her rival.

The film was shot in Kinglake West, Victoria, Australia, and Docklands Studios Melbourne.

== Plot ==
At school, Erica is not very popular. She is an arrogant girl who believes herself superior to everyone in Barringa East, a council town that is dilapidated and mostly vandalised. Sitting alone in class, she is distant towards other students as she feels her intellect is far higher to theirs. Erica has three siblings with distinct and unapproachable characteristics. Her 7 year old sister Jedda thinks that she is a horse, her older brother Harley is a downbeat hippie who believes in aliens and her older sister Valjoy is a confident, chic, but arrogant woman. With dreams of becoming a famous theatrical actress, Erica often creates highly exaggerated stories about herself to impress her classmates and is a hypochondriac, constantly visiting the school sickbay for made-up ailments.

While many of the teachers at Barringa East Primary are incompetent, her grade 6 teacher Miss Belmont is intelligent and disciplinary, and Erica thrives under her control. She outshines her classmates by putting effort in her projects, and just as her ego begins to bloom, a section of one of the upper-class estates surrounding Barringa East is reclassified as part of their suburb, and due to the zoning system a new student, Alison Ashley, is placed in Erica's class. Alison Ashley is a beautiful, rich, neat and intelligent girl, traits that Erica instantly grows envious of. She is seated beside Erica in class and though at first Erica wants to impress Alison in the hopes that she will befriend Erica, her jealousy of the girl grows stronger throughout the day, until she finally pushes Alison away. Over the next few days, Alison's organisation and talent angers Erica until finally she snaps, offending Alison. Meanwhile, Erica also cannot stand her mother's new boyfriend, Lennie, despite being a decent man. Although Erica fabricated the lie that her father died, it was revealed that he actually ceased contact with the family.

On many occasions, Alison appears to want to instigate a friendship, though Erica stubbornly turns her away out of spite and envy. Alison visits Erica's house, and after Erica's family humiliates her several times she accuses Alison of being judgmental and nosy. The two girls are later placed in a cabin and group together on the annual school camp. Erica is once again outdone and thus infuriated by Alison Ashley, particularly in the camp play, where she suffers from stage fright while Alison displays skill as an actress and is cast in the lead role. On performance she can not bear to watch Alison take the spotlight and flees to her cabin. Erica discovers that although Alison was in the lead role, her mother did not bother to attend the camp performance night as she cared little about her daughter, revealing to Erica that Alison does not have the perfect spoiled life as she imagined. At first Allison got upset with Erica as she was spying, but later the two reconcile and become friends after understanding each other's backgrounds. Following the school play, Lennie proposes to Mrs. Yurken, in which she accepts. Erica finally lets go of her resentment towards Lennie, and congratulates the two.

== Cast ==
- Delta Goodrem as Alison Ashley
- Saskia Burmeister as Erica Yurken
- Jean Kittson as Ms. Nigella Belmont
- Tracy Mann as Erica's mother
- Richard Carter as Lennie Grubb
- Craig McLachlan as Jeff Kennard
- Rachael Carpani as Valjoy Yurken
- Holly Myers as Ms. Lattimore
- Anthony Cleave as Harley Yurken
- Abigail Gudgeon as Jedda Yurken
- Alexander Cappelli as Barry Hollis
- Damien Bodie as Damo

== Reception ==
Hating Alison Ashley grossed $2,085,751 at the box office in Australia.

Burmeister received positive reviews for her performance as well as an AFI nomination for best actress. In contrast, Goodrem's performance received mixed to negative reviews.

== Soundtrack ==
A soundtrack to the film was released on 8 March 2005 by Festival Records.

=== Track listing ===
1. "Stockholm Syndrome" - Blink-182
2. "Mr Es Beautiful Blues" - The Eels
3. "Don't Tell Me" - Gabriella Cilmi
4. "Maybe" - Daniel Merriweather (feat. Lee Sissing)
5. "Green Eyed World" - The Blips (feat. Amiel)
6. "Cyclone" - Dub Pistols
7. "Trashed" - Jacket
8. "Lifting The Veil From The Braille" - The Dissociatives
9. "Come Clean" - Hilary Duff
10. "Sorry" - Gabriella Cilmi
11. "I See You Baby" - Groove Armada
12. "Lighthouse" - The Waifs
13. "Mini Morris Parts 1 And 2" - Cezary Skubiszewski and Paul Mac
14. "Six White Boomers" - The Goanna Gang

== See also ==
- Cinema of Australia
