= Hating Alison Ashley (novel) =

1984 novel by Robin Klein

- Cover of the first edition
- Author: Robin Klein
- Language: English
- Publisher: Puffin Books
- Publication date: 1984
- Publication place: Australia
- Pages: 192 (first edition)
- ISBN: 0140316728 (first edition)

Hating Alison Ashley is a 1984 Australian children's novel by Australian author Robin Klein. Set in a fictionalised suburb of eastern Melbourne, the book examines the social pressure of Grade Six through the darkly comedic lens of classmate rivalry and class consciousness. It was inspired by Klein's role as an art and craft teacher at Jordanville South Primary School, which was located in a Housing Commission estate built in the 1950s to house war veterans. By the 1970s, when Klein was working there, the estate had become a pocket of disadvantage surrounded by middle-class suburbs such as Chadstone and Mount Waverley.

The novel refers to a new freeway; this would have been the South-Eastern Arterial Road (now the Monash Freeway), for which many private homes in Chadstone, Glen Iris and Malvern were acquired and demolished, prompting school rezonings. The opening of the South-Eastern Arterial Road sets the novel in 1977.

In a key scene, Alison photographs a tyre tunnel. This was an actual feature of the Jordanville South school playground.

The school was demolished in the early 1990s by the Victorian Liberal government under Premier Jeff Kennett, and the land was given to developers.

One of Klein's most popular preteen novels, Hating Alison Ashley has become a standard English text for school students across Australia.

The book was nominated for eight Australian literature awards and won the Young Australian Best Book Award (YABBA) in 1986 and the Kids Own Australian Literature Award (KOALA) in 1987.

It has since become a play, adapted by Richard Tulloch and directed by Nici Wood, and a film, Hating Alison Ashley directed by Geoff Bennett with Delta Goodrem in the title role.

== Plot ==
Erica Yurken, aged 11 and the third of four children, is in Year Six at Barringa East Primary. She lives in a Melbourne Housing Commission suburb that is dilapidated and plagued by social disadvantage. At school, she dreams of becoming a famous actress and creates exaggerated stories to boost her self-esteem. She is a hypochondriac, constantly visiting the school sick bay for vague ailments. While many of the teachers at Barringa East Primary are overwhelmed by the unruly pupils, Grade 6 teacher Miss Belmont is a disciplinarian and hard-working Erica thrives under her control. But when Melbourne's south-eastern freeway is opened, new school zonings come into effect and Erica's class gains a new student: Alison Ashley.

Alison is rich, neat, pretty and smart, traits that instantly spark Erica's aspirational tendency. Despite wanting to impress Alison and be her friend, Erica is torn apart by envy. She becomes even more embarrassed by her own family's shortcomings, not least her mother's job as a barmaid and new boyfriend Lenny, a truck driver. Meanwhile, Alison appears to want a friendship, though Erica stubbornly turns her away out of spite and envy. Alison visits Erica's house to return school paperwork and is invited to a family barbecue; Erica accuses Alison of being judgmental and nosy. Shortly after, Erica returns a folder to Alison's house and envies Alison's luxurious surroundings, which are painfully opposite her own. Erica's visit wakes up Alison's sleeping mother, from whose anger Alison tries to protect Erica. Erica is offended, and leaves.

The two girls are later placed together in a cabin for the annual Grade Six camp at The Basin, in the Dandenong Ranges east of Melbourne. Erica writes a play but suffers from stage fright and has to cede the lead role to Alison, who maintains her usual implacable calm and shows real talent as an actor. On show night Erica flees the theatre for her cabin. There she finds a beautiful book, handmade by Alison, who has compiled the two plays -- Cinderella and Barringa East Hospital -- that Erica wrote for the camp groups. Erica discovers that although Alison played the lead role, her mother did not bother to attend. Erica's mother and Lenny arrive with hand-sequinned slippers that save the Cinderella show. Erica suddenly appreciates her chaotic, unglamorous yet warm family life, and welcomes Alison into it.
