= Sophie Lee =

Australian actress (born 1968)

- Born: 7 August 1968 (age 58); Newcastle, New South Wales, Australia
- Occupations: Actress, author
- Years active: 1987−present
- Spouse: Anthony Freedman (m. 2002)
- Partner(s): Mick Molloy (1994–2000)
- Children: 3

Sophie Lee (born 7 August 1968) is an Australian film, stage and television actress and author.

== Career ==
Lee worked as a model early in her career, both in Australia and Japan appearing in print and on TV. Her first feature film was Raw Silk in 1988.

She first rose to fame in 1990 for hosting The Bugs Bunny Show on Australian TV. The Nine Network series, which had previously not been hosted, featured Bugs Bunny and other Warner Bros. Looney Tunes and Merrie Melodies cartoons, plus occasional other material, such as an interview between Sophie and Kylie Minogue. She was cast by executive producer David Lyle out of 150 candidates. In 1991, Lee started playing the ongoing role of Penny Wellings in the drama series The Flying Doctors.

That year Lee also formed a pop group, Freaked Out Flower Children, performing on saxophone and vocals. In December that year the group issued their sole album, Love In, which Australian musicologist, Ian McFarlane, found was "full of syncopated beats and breezy melodies wrapped around tunes". The group's debut single, "Spill the Wine", was a cover version of Eric Burdon and War's 1970 hit. Freaked Out Flower Children's version reached No. 31 on the ARIA Singles Chart, but by 1993 the group had disbanded. "The concept had run its course ... [as the] retro-cabaret and day-glo focus of the ensemble ... did little to foster a sense of longevity".

In 1992, she also hosted the TV series Sex. Lee built on this in the media, speaking out on feminism, sexism and the need for sex education in the AIDS era.

Lee has acted in a number of iconic films, including the Australian comedies Muriel's Wedding, Bootmen and The Castle as well as cult films such as He Died with a Felafel in His Hand and Titsiana Booberini. She is a patron of "Big Screen" at the National Film and Sound Archive. For her performance in the 1997 film The Castle, Lee was nominated for the Australian Film Institute Award for Best Supporting Actress.

Lee has appeared in a number of stage productions, including Mr Kolpert with the Sydney Theatre Company and the title role in The Virgin Mim. From 2008, she has hosted "Natgeo Presents with Sophie Lee" on the National Geographic channel. She is also a commentator on the series 20 to 1.

In 2007, Lee branched into writing, releasing a book in 2007 titled "Alice in La La Land" through Random House publishing. The book is inspired by her time spent in Hollywood. Also in 2007, she became a columnist for "Sunday Magazine". In 2009 Sophie released her first children's novel titled "Edie Amelia and the Monkey Shoe Mystery", a story for 7+ year-olds, published by Pan Macmillan. The second title in the series is "Edie Amelia and The Runcible River Fever".

== Personal life ==
Born in Newcastle, New South Wales, her family did not have a TV in the house as her father, a philosophy professor at the University of Newcastle, preferred more intellectual pursuits. She attended the local public school in Dudley, Newcastle, and St Mary's Convent school. She completed year 12 at St Francis Xavier's College, Hamilton, in 1986, achieving academic excellence. She appeared in a school production of Frankenstein, playing Baron Frankenstein. She moved to Sydney at age 18 for her career. When working at GTV-9 in the early 1990s, she lived in St Kilda, Victoria.

For six years up to early 2000, she was the partner of Melbourne comedian Mick Molloy, regularly appearing on his nationally syndicated radio show.

In 2002 she married Anthony Freedman and stated that she would be converting to Judaism. The couple have a daughter, Edie, and two sons, Tom and Jack. Edie is named after Andy Warhol muse Edie Sedgwick.

== In popular culture ==
- Australian band TISM's 1993 song "Get Thee to a Nunnery" was specifically about Sophie Lee, mentioning her by name.

== Filmography ==
=== Film ===
Year	Title	Role	Type
1988	Raw Silk	Josie	TV movie
1994	Muriel's Wedding	Tania Degano	Feature film
1994	Halifax f.p.	Corri Neale	TV film series, episode 1: "Acts of Betrayal"
1997	The Castle	Tracey Petropoulous (née Kerrigan)	Feature film
1997	The Hostages	Kate	TV movie
1997	Good Guys Bad Guys: Only The Good Die Young	Amy	TV pilot movie
1997	Titsiana Booberini	Francine Pickles	Short film
1999	Holy Smoke	Yvonne	Feature film
2000	Bootmen	Linda	Feature film
2001	He Died with a Felafel in His Hand	Nina	Feature film
2002	Tanya and Floyd	Mickey Falstaff	TV pilot movie
2002	Mimi	Catherine	Short film
2006	BlackJack: Dead Memory	Denise Kennedy	TV film series, 1 episode
2006	BlackJack: At The Gates	Denise Kennedy	TV film series, 1 episode
2006	BlackJack: Ghosts	Denise Kennedy	TV film series, 1 episode
2012	Mental	Jean	Feature film

=== Television ===
Title	Year	Role	Type
1990-91	The Bugs Bunny Show	Host	TV series
1991-92	The Flying Doctors	Penny Wellings	TV series, season 8-9, 49 episodes
1991	Video Smash Hits	Herself (with Freaked Out Flower Children band)	TV series, 1 episode
1991	The Main Event	Herself	TV series, 1 episode
1991	Sex	Host	TV special
1992	In Sydney Today	Guest	TV series, 1 episode
1992	The Midday Show	Guest	TV series, 1 episode
1992	Sex	Host	TV series
1992	The Midday Show	Guest	TV series, 1 episode
1992	The Afternoon Show	Guest	TV series, 1 episode
1992	Vidiot	Herself	TV series, 1 episode
1993	Typhon's People	Maia Tertius	TV miniseries, 2 episodes
1993	R.F.D.S.	Penny Wellings	TV series, 13 episodes
1995	Good Morning Australia	Herself (with Sarah Chadwick)	TV series, 1 episode
1997	Good Morning Australia	Guest	TV series, 1 episode
1997	Roy and HG	Guest	TV series, 1 episode
1997	Raw FM	Patty	TV series, 1 episode
1998	Small Tales & True	Jacqui	TV series, 1 episode
2000	Good News Week	Master of Ceremonies	TV series, 1 episode
2000	The Big Schmooze	Guest	TV series, 1 episode
2000	Something in the Air	Jennifer Leveson	TV series, 4 episodes
2004	Stingers	Veronica Taylor	TV series, 3 episodes
2004	The Chaser Decides	Herself	TV series, 1 episode
2004	The Australian Film Institute Awards	Herself	TV special
2007-09	20 to One	Herself	TV series, 5 episodes
2008	Natgeo Presents with Sophie Lee	Presenter	TV series, 7 episodes
2009	Talkin' 'Bout Your Generation	Herself	TV series, 1 episode
2013	Dance Academy	Gabrielle	TV series, 4 episodes
2014	Puberty Blues	Mrs. Travers	TV series, 2 episodes
2016	The Morning Show	Guest	TV series, 1 episode

== Theatre ==
Title	Year	Role	Venue / Company
1992	Love Letters	Melissa Gardner	Sydney Opera House
1994	Tanya and Kit		La Mama, Napier Street Theatre, Melbourne
1994	The Borgia Apartment		Napier Street Theatre, Melbourne
1995	Summer of the Seventeenth Doll	Bubba Ryan	Playhouse Melbourne, Monash University, Bunbury Regional Entertainment Centre, Queens Park Theatre Geraldton, Centennial Theatre Kalgoorlie, His Majesty's Theatre, Perth, Glen Street Theatre, Canberra Theatre, Ford Theatre Geelong, The Capital - Bendigo's Performing Arts Centre, Gold Coast Arts Centre
1995	The Judgement of Helen		Theatre Works, Melbourne
1996	Gary's House	Sue-Ann	Q Theatre Penrith, Malthouse Theatre, Gold Coast Arts Centre, Hobart
1997	A Midsummer Night's Dream	Adaptor	Royal Botanic Gardens Melbourne
1998	Miracles	Sparkes / Louise	Malthouse Theatre
2002	Mr Kolpert	Sarah	Wharf Theatre with Sydney Theatre Company
2002	The Virgin Mim	Mim	Wharf Theatre with Sydney Theatre Company
2005	Love Letters	Melissa Gardner	Parade Theatre
