= The Big Schmooze =

Australian television series

The Big Schmooze is an Australian television comedy talk show on The Comedy Channel. The series featured comedy sketches and interviews.

== Cast ==
- Matthew Hardy
- Kate Langbroek
- Dave O'Neil
- Mark O'Toole
- Paul Calleja
- Ray Matsen
- Lisa Hensley
- Tania Lacy
- Bernard Curry

== See also ==
- List of Australian television series
