= Robin Klein =

Australian author of books for children (born 1936)

- Born: Robin McMaugh Klein; 28 February 1936 (age 90); Kempsey, New South Wales, Australia
- Writing career
- Genres: Children's, young adult fiction
- Notable works: Hating Alison Ashley, Halfway Across the Galaxy and Turn Left, Came Back to Show You I Could Fly

Robin McMaugh Klein (born 28 February 1936) is an Australian author of books for children. She was born in Kempsey, New South Wales, Australia, and now resides near Melbourne.

== Early life ==
Robin Klein is one of nine children. She had her first short story published at the age of 16. She worked in a number of jobs before becoming an established writer, including tea lady at a warehouse, bookshop assistant, nurse, copper enamelist, and program aide at a school for disadvantaged children. In 1981, she was awarded a Literature Board grant for writing, and since then, she has published more than 20 books. Robin Klein was educated at Newcastle Girls' High School.

== Career ==
Several of her books have been short-listed for the Children's Book Council of Australia (CBCA) Children's Book of the Year Award, including Hating Alison Ashley (also a film starring Delta Goodrem) and Halfway Across the Galaxy and Turn Left (filmed as a television series for the Seven Network in 1992). Klein's novel Came Back to Show You I Could Fly won a human rights award for literature in 1989 and also won the 1990 CBCA Children's Book of the Year Award: Older Readers. It was filmed as Say a Little Prayer in 1993.

Several of her other books have received awards in Australia, including the South Australian Festival Award for Literature, which she won in 1998 with The Listmaker. Many others, including Boss of the Pool, have also won or been short-listed.

Robin Klein suffered an aneurysm rupture, and while she survived, since 2005, she has lived in a nursing home and is no longer able to write or do significant publicity work for her books.

== Legacy ==
Editor and author Jon Appleton published the memoir Letters From Robin in 2022. The book details his correspondence and friendship with Klein during the height of her career.

== Awards ==
- Special mention – Critici in Erba Prize at Bologna for The Giraffe in Pepperell Street (1978)
- Won – CBCA Children's Book of the Year Award: Younger Readers for Thing (1983)
- Won – Human Rights Literature and Awards (1989)
- Won – CBCA Children's Book of the Year Award: Older Readers for Came Back to Show You I Could Fly (1990)
- Won – Canberra's Own Outstanding List: Fiction for Older Readers Award for People Might Hear You (1991)
- Won – Dromkeen Medal (1991)
- Won – Canberra's Own Outstanding List: Fiction for Older Readers Award for Came Back to Show You I Could Fly (1992)

== Bibliography ==
=== Collections ===
- Ratbags and Rascals : Funny Stories (J.M. Dent, 1984), illustrated by Alison Lester
- Snakes and Ladders : poems about the ups and downs of life (J.M. Dent, 1985), illustrated by Ann James
- Tearaways (Viking, 1990, first published as Stories to Make You Think Twice)

=== Penny Pollard books ===
illustrated by Ann James

1. Penny Pollard's Diary (Oxford University Press, 1983)
2. Penny Pollard's Letters (Oxford University Press, 1984)
3. Penny Pollard in Print (Oxford University Press, 1986)
4. Penny Pollard's Passport (Oxford University Press, 1988)
5. Penny Pollard's Guide to Modern Manners (Oxford University Press, 1989)
6. Penny Pollard's Scrapbook (Hodder Children's Books Australia, 1999)

=== Thing books ===
1. Thing (Oxford University Press, 1982) illustrated by Alison Lester
2. Thingnapped! (Oxford University Press, 1984)
3. Thing Finds a Job (Hodder Headline, 1996), illustrated by Alison Lester
4. Thing's Concert (Hodder Headline, 1996), illustrated by Alison Lester
5. Thing's Birthday (Hodder Headline, 1996), illustrated by Alison Lester
6. Thingitis (Hodder Headline, 1996), illustrated by Alison Lester

=== The Melling Sisters trilogy ===
1. All in the Blue Unclouded Weather (Viking, 1991)
2. Dresses of Red and Gold (Viking, 1992)
3. The Sky in Silver Lace (Penguin Books, 1995)

=== Miscellaneous ===
- The Giraffe in Pepperell Street (Hodder and Stoughton, 1978), illustrated by Gill Tomblin
- Junk Castle (Oxford University Press, 1983), illustrated by Rolf Heimann
- People Might Hear You (Puffin Books, 1983)
- Oodoolay (Era Publications, c1983), illustrated by Vivienne Goodman
- Brock and the Dragon (Hodder & Stoughton, 1984), illustrated by Rodney McRae
- Hating Alison Ashley (Puffin Books, 1984)
- Thalia, the Failure (Ashton Scholastic, 1984), illustrated by Rhyll Plant
- The Enemies (Angus & Robertson, 1985), illustrated by Noela Young
- Halfway Across the Galaxy and Turn Left (Viking Kestrel, 1985)
- Serve Him Right! (Edward Arnold (Australia), 1985), illustrated by John Burge
- You're on Your Own! (Edward Arnold, 1985)
- Good For Something (Edward Arnold Australia, 1985)
- Separate Places (Roo Books, 1985), illustrated by Astra Lacis
- Games (Viking Kestrel, 1986), illustrated by Melissa Webb
- Boss of the Pool (Omnibus in association with Penguin, 1986)
- The Princess who Hated It (Omnibus Books, 1986), illustrated by Maire Smith
- Robin Klein's Crookbook (Methuen Australia, 1987), illustrated by Kristen Hilliard
- Don't Tell Lucy (Methuen Australia, 1987)
- Birk, the Berserker (Omnibus Books, 1987), illustrated by Alison Lester
- The Lonely Hearts Club (Oxford University Press, 1987), with Max Dann
- I Shot an Arrow (Viking Kestrel, 1987), illustrated by Geoff Hocking
- Christmas (Methuen, c1987), illustrated by Kristen Hilliard
- Laurie Loved Me Best (Viking Kestrel, 1988)
- Jane's Mansion (Shortland, 1988), illustrated by Melissa Webb
- The Kidnapping of Clarissa Montgomery (Shortland, 1988), illustrated by Jane Wallace-Mitchell
- Against the Odds (Puffin Books, 1989), illustrated by Bill Wood
- Honoured Guest (Angus & Robertson, 1989)
- Came Back to Show You I Could Fly (Viking Penguin, 1989)
- The Ghost in Abigail Terrace (Omnibus Books, 1989), illustrated by Margaret Power
- Boris and Borsch (Allen & Unwin, 1990), illustrated by Cathy Wilcox
- Amy's Bed (Omnibus Books, 1992), illustrated by Coral Tulloch
- Seeing Things (Penguin Books Australia, 1993)
- Turn Right for Zyrgon (Puffin, 1994)
- The Listmaker (Viking, 1997)
- Barney's Blues (Puffin, 1998), illustrated by David Cox
- The Goddess (Lothian, 1998), illustrated by Anne Spudvilas
- Gabby's Fair (Omnibus Books, 1998), illustrated by Michael Johnson
- Anything Happens
- Tor Atar Gu (Abhishek Das Books)

=== Adaptations ===
==== Television ====
- Thing
- Penny Pollard's Diary
- Halfway Across the Galaxy and Turn Left, adapted by Michael Harvey and John Reeves (1991–1992)

==== Stage ====
- Hating Alison Ashley: The Play, adapted by Richard Tulloch
- Boss of the Pool, adapted by Mary Morris

==== Film ====
- Say a Little Prayer, based on Came Back to Show You I Could Fly, adapted and directed by Richard Lowenstein (1993)
- Hating Alison Ashley, adapted for the screen by Chris Anastassiades and Christine Madafferi (2005)
