= Came Back to Show You I Could Fly =

1989 novel by Robin Klein

- First edition
- Author: Robin Klein
- Language: English
- Genre: Children's Young adult novel
- Publisher: Viking Kestrel
- Publication date: 1989
- Publication place: Australia
- Media type: Print (Paperback)
- Pages: 180 pp
- ISBN: 0140342540
- OCLC: 24795404

Came Back to Show You I Could Fly is a novel by Robin Klein. It tells the story of a friendship between a lonely 11-year-old boy and a drug-addicted, pregnant 20-year-old woman. It was given the designation of White Raven book at the 1990 Bologna Children's Book Fair. Due to rights issues with the eponymous song, From the Inside, the 1993 film adaptation directed by Richard Lowenstein was named Say a Little Prayer.

== Plot summary ==
The novel begins with shy, eleven-year-old Seymour staying with Thelma, an acquaintance of his mother for the summer holidays. Seymour's parents have split and are arguing over custody of him. After a drunken threat by Seymour's father to take him away interstate, his mother has Seymour relocated to Thelma's house on Victoria Road, where Seymour is bored and lonely. During the day, while Thelma is at work, Seymour is not allowed to open the door, or leave the house, because of his mother's fear that his father might come and find him.

One morning Seymour decides to climb over the back gate and walk to the nearby shops. He goes to a park where a group of children tease him. Not knowing how to defend himself, Seymour runs away and is chased. In desperation he goes through a random gate and meets a young girl: Angie. Angie is described as in her late teens, and as a beautiful angel. Seymour is drawn to Angie because she treats him with the affection and friendliness that he lacks from his parents. Angie takes him on outings to horse races, her mother's house, shops, and a restaurant. Over the course of the novel Seymour's faint suspicions about Angie develop, but he refuses to consider them.

One day Seymour finds Angie in her flat looking sick and acting "peculiar". He calls her sister Lynne. Lynne comes over and after looking at Angie with disdain, rings her father who drives up and takes Angie away. Lynne advises Seymour to keep away from Angie and that he is wasting his time. Nonetheless, Seymour resolves to go to Angie's flat and clean it for when she comes home. He discovers that it has already been cleaned and almost everything is packed away. Lynne finds Seymour in the flat and tells him that Angie won't be coming back, and that Angie has been taking drugs for nearly five years. Angie is going to Rankin House, a rehabilitation center temporarily, then to Lakeview.

Seymour visits Angie to give her the doll that was left at the flat. After initially being hostile Angie pretends that she has been sick with pleurisy and will be back soon. They begin to fight, but Seymour, weary of her lying, returns the doll and leaves.

Angie apologises to Seymour through a letter and writes about the rehab, and how when her baby is born they will go to live with her parents. In the postscript there is Seymour's reply. He describes Carrucan, where he and his mother have moved to, and that his father visited him and got a job as a truck driver. Seymour talks about how he has made a friend called Martin, is finally learning how to swim and that when Angie gets out of Lakeview they can go out to places together with her baby.

== Characters ==
Seymour Kerley is eleven years old and the self-conscious and reserved main character.

Angela "Angie" Fleur Easterbrook is a kind and charismatic 20-year-old who becomes friends with Seymour. Unbeknownst to Seymour, Angie is pregnant, taking drugs and in debt with drug dealers.

Marie Kerley is Seymour's strong-willed, dramatic mother.

Mr. Kerley is Seymour's alcoholic, jobless father.

Thelma is the acquaintance of Seymour's mother through a church group.

Jennette Easterbrook is Angie's mother.

Lynne Easterbrook is Angie's ballet-dancer sister.

David Easterbrook is Angie's brother.

Stuart Easterbrook is Angie's father.

Jason (Jas) is Angie's boyfriend. He stole from her parents and got her onto drugs. He is the father of her unborn child, and is currently in jail.

== Awards ==
- Won - Human Rights Award: Children's Book (1989)
- Won - CBCA Children's Book of the Year Award: Older Readers (1990)
- Won - Canberra's Own Outstanding List: Fiction for Older Readers Award (1992)

== Reviews ==
- School Library Journal, February, 1991, Libby White, review of Came Back to Show You I Could Fly, p. 81
- Bulletin of the Center for Children's Books, November, 1990, Roger Sutton, review of Came Back to Show You I Could Fly, p. 64
- Voice of Youth Advocates, February, 1991, James Cook, review of Came Back to Show You I Could Fly, p. 352.
