= Freaked Out Flower Children =

Australian band

- Origin: Melbourne, Victoria, Australia
- Genres: Flower power
- Years active: 1991–1993
- Labels: Virgin
- Past members: Gumpy Phillips; Tricky J Sophie Lee; Nicole Love; Fiona Ruttelle

Freaked Out Flower Children were an Australian band which formed in 1991 with actress and TV presenter, Sophie Lee, on saxophone and vocals. Other members were Gumpy Phillips (ex-Battle Happy, Mighty Big Crime) on guitar and vocals; Tricky J (Mighty Big Crime) on synthesiser; Fiona Ruttelle on backing vocals; and Nicole Love on backing vocals. They played 1960s-style flower power music. Their debut single "Spill the Wine" – a cover version of Eric Burdon and War's 1970 hit – reached No. 31 on the ARIA Singles Chart in 1992. In December 1991 the group issued their debut album, Love In, on Virgin Records, which was "full of syncopated beats and breezy melodies". A second single, "Beautiful People" was released in March 1992. However the group's "retro-cabaret and day-glo focus ... did little to foster a sense of longevity". They disbanded in 1993.

== Members ==
- Gumpy Phillips – Guitar, vocals
- Tricky J – Synthesiser programming
- Sophie Lee – Saxophone, vocals
- Nicole Love – backing vocals
- Fiona Ruttelle – backing vocals

== Discography ==
=== Studio albums ===
List of albums, with selected chart positions
| Title | Album details | Peak chart positions |
| Title | Album details | AUS |
|---|---|---|
| Love In | Released: December 1991; Format: CD; Label: Virgin | 81 |

=== Singles ===
List of singles, with selected chart positions
| Year | Title | Peak chart positions | Album |
| Year | Title | AUS | Album |
|---|---|---|---|
| 1991 | "Spill the Wine" | 31 | Love In |
| 1992 | "Beautiful People" | 102 | Love In |
