= Say a Little Prayer =

- Directed by: Richard Lowenstein
- Written by: Richard Lowenstein, Robin Klein
- Based on: novel Come Back to Show You I Could Fly by Robin Klein
- Produced by: Carol Hughes; Richard Lowenstein
- Starring: Sudi de Winter; Fiona Ruttelle
- Cinematography: Graeme Wood
- Edited by: Jill Bilcock
- Distributed by: Beyond International Group
- Release date: 1993
- Running time: 98 minutes
- Country: Australia
- Language: English
- Budget: A$3 million
- Box office: A$12,500 (Australia)

Say a Little Prayer is an Australian children's film by Richard Lowenstein. It stars Sudi de Winter, Fiona Ruttelle, Rebecca Smart, Lynne Murphy and Jill Forster. The film was written by Richard Lowenstein, based on Robin Klein's novel, Came Back to Show You I Could Fly. It was nominated for four Australian Film Institute Awards.

== Premise ==
Say a Little Prayer tells the story of a friendship between a lonely 11-year-old boy and a drug-addicted young lady.

== Cast ==
- Sudi de Winter as Seymour, 11-year-old boy
- Fiona Ruttelle as Angie, 20-something
- Rebecca Smart as Lynne, Angie's younger sister
- Lynne Murphy as Thelma, Seymour's guardian
- Mickey Camilleri as Seymour's Mum
- Ben Mendelsohn as Nursery Boss
- Jill Forster as Mrs Easterbrook, Angie's Mum

== Production ==
- Director & Screenwriter: Richard Lowenstein
- Producer: Carol Hughes
- Director of Photography: Graeme Wood
- Editing: Jill Bilcock
- Production Design: Chris Kennedy
- Art Direction: Hugh Bateman
- Sound Recordist: Lloyd Carrick
- Costume Design: Lynn-Maree Milburn
- Music: David Bridie, John Phillips

The film was funded by the 1991 Australian Film Finance Corporation's Film Fund Scheme. The production company was Flying Films and distribution was by Beyond International.

== Awards ==
- Nomination – AFI Award – Best Actress in a Lead Role (Fiona Ruttelle)
- Nomination – AFI Award – Best Actress in a Supporting Role (Jill Forster)
- Nomination – AFI Award – Best Achievement in Production Design (Chris Kennedy)
- Nomination – AFI Award – Best Achievement in Costume Design (Lynn-Maree Milburn, Jacqui Everitt)
- Winner – Giffoni Film Festival – Best Director (Richard Lowenstein)
- Winner – Giffoni Film Festival – Best Actress (Fiona Ruttelle)

== Box office ==
Say a Little Prayer grossed $12,500 at the box office in Australia.

== See also ==
- Cinema of Australia
