= Tributary, Douglasville =

Community in Georgia, U.S.

Coordinates: 33°42′50″N 84°38′30″W

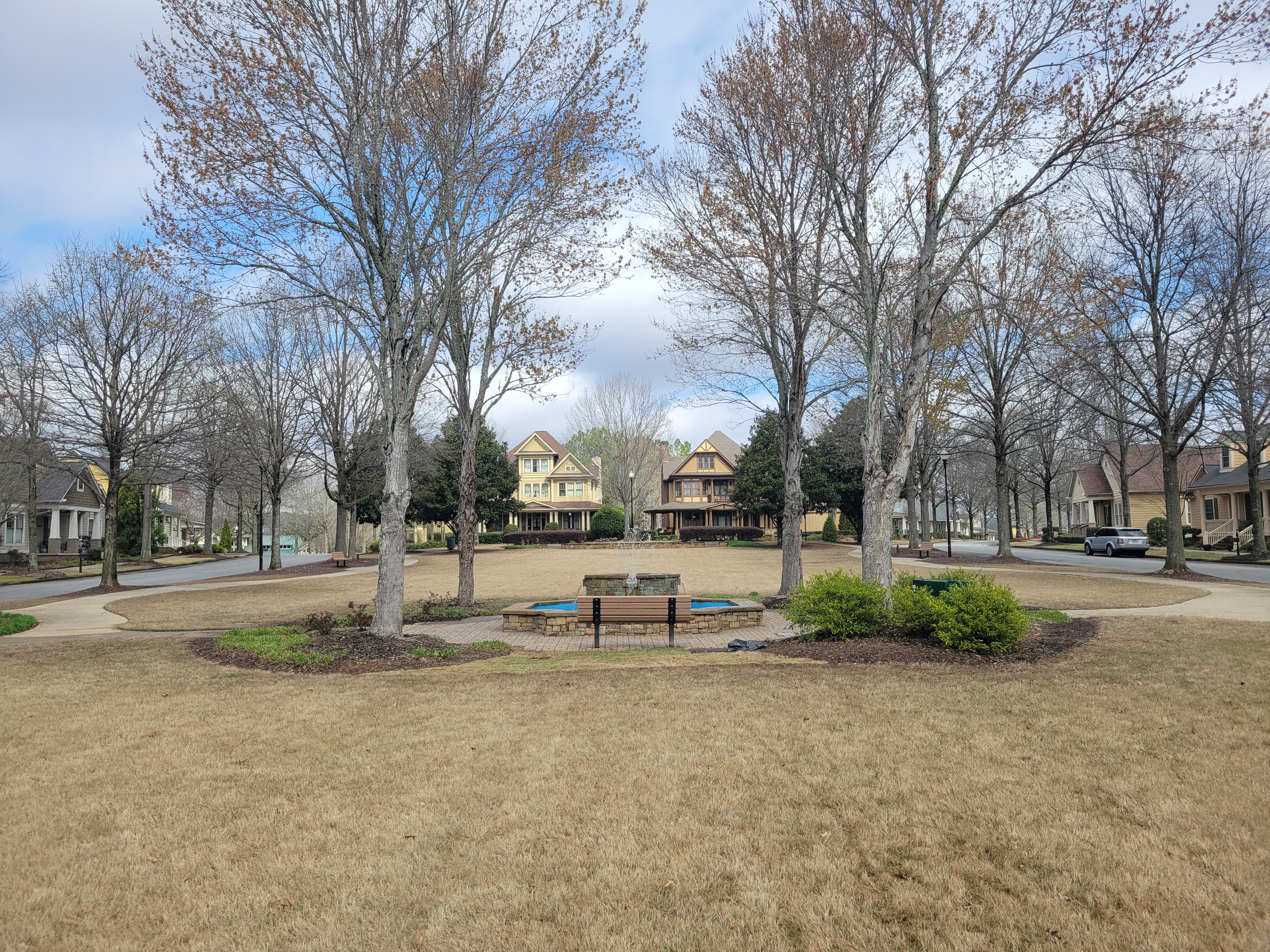
Founders Park

Tributary is a community in the New Manchester area of east Douglas County, Georgia, within the Douglasville, Georgia United States, city limits, consisting of a 1,475-acre (597 ha) master-planned mixed-use development built along the principles of New Urbanism.

The community consists of three major sections:

- Residential area
- Mixed-use "Village Center" planned for up to 500,000 square feet (46,000 m^{2}) of commercial space, 65 acres (26 ha), including a walkable "Main Street" lined with retail shops, an area that will accommodate a supermarket and a "big box" retailer, office space and approximately 400 residential units.
- Tributary Park of Commerce, where the American Red Cross has opened its new Leadership in Energy and Environmental Design-certified regional headquarters, among what is eventually planned to be up to 1,500,000 square feet (140,000 m^{2}) of low- and mid-rise office buildings.

The community is planned with extensive space for parks and recreation, as well as pedestrian and cycling links, as part of the New Urbanist design.
