= Heathmont =

- Suburb
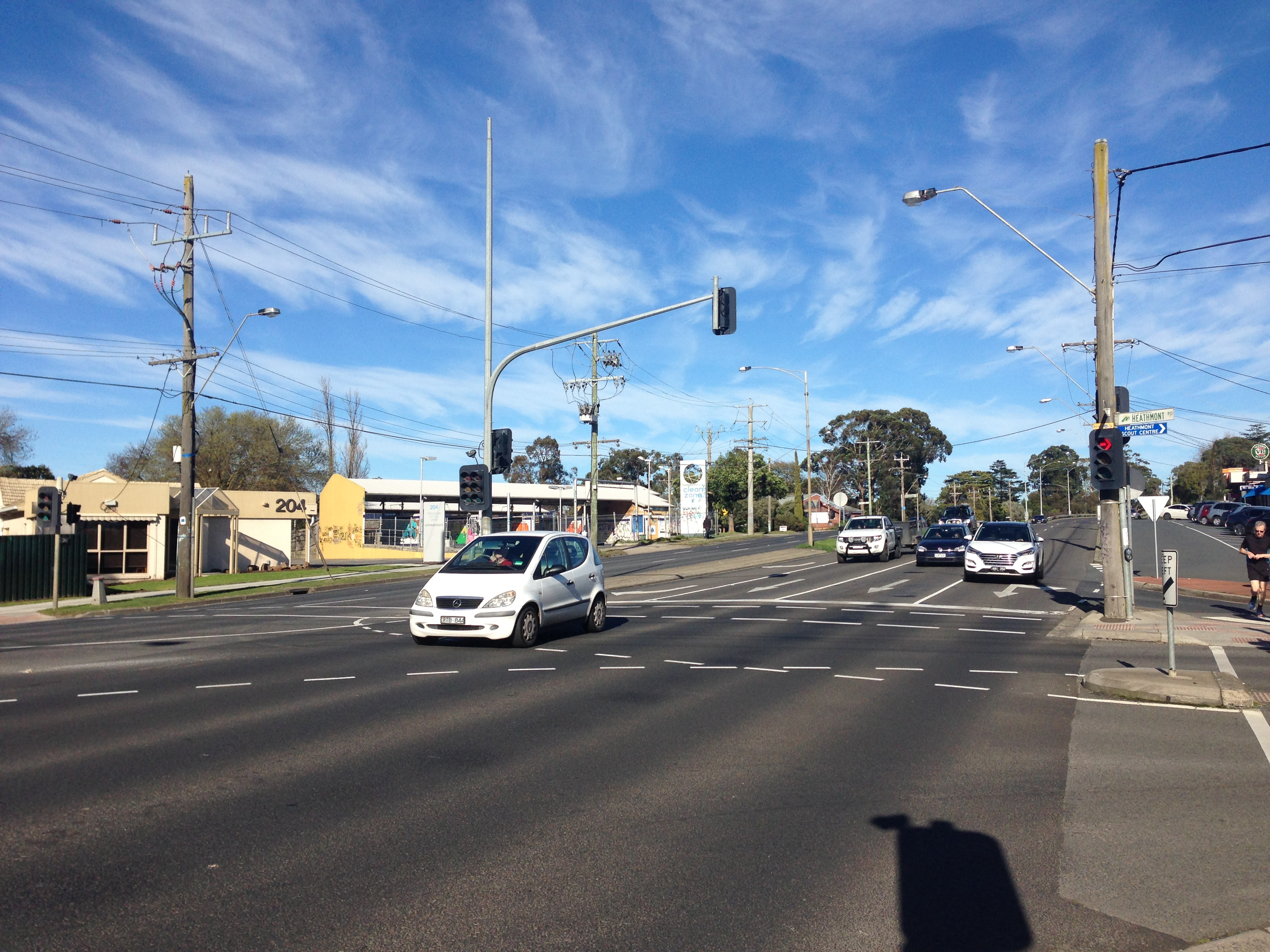
- Canterbury Road, Heathmont

- Interactive map of Heathmont
- Coordinates: 37.829°S 145.246°E
- Country: Australia
- State: Victoria
- City: Melbourne
- LGA: City of Maroondah
- Location: 26 km (16 mi) E of Melbourne CBD (Central Melbourne)

Government
  - State electorate: Ringwood
  - Federal divisions: Aston; Deakin

Area
  - Total: 4.5 km^{2} (1.7 sq mi)
- Elevation: 113 m (371 ft)

Population
  - Total: 9,933 (2021 census)
  - Density: 2,207/km^{2} (5,720/sq mi)
- Postcode: 3135
- County: Mornington
Suburbs around Heathmont
Ringwood	Ringwood East	Bayswater North
Ringwood	Heathmont	Bayswater North
Wantirna	Bayswater	Bayswater

Heathmont is a suburb of Melbourne, Victoria, Australia, 26 kilometres (16 mi) east of Melbourne's Central Business District, located within the City of Maroondah local government area. Heathmont recorded a population of 9,933 at the 2021 census.

== History ==
Heathmont was originally covered by hedge-to-hedge apple orchards. The name appears to have come from the rising land in the area having heath or low, shrub-like vegetation on it. The first shop opened in 1923 in front of a house. The population has grown from 600 people in 1953 to 8,787 people in 2001.

Heathmont Post Office opened on 15 February 1929, sometime after the railway station opened in 1926.

Heathmont was originally within the municipality of the City of Ringwood, but it became part of Maroondah City Council in December 1994.

== Public transport ==
Heathmont railway station is located just off Canterbury Road (which runs through the heart of the suburb) and is on the Belgrave railway line. It is within ticketing Zone 2.

Ventura bus route 679, which runs from Chirnside Park to Ringwood Station via Lilydale, Mount Evelyn and along Canterbury Road, Great Ryrie St and Bedford Road, serves much of Heathmont.

== Shopping ==
The Heathmont Shopping Centre provides services to the suburb. It includes a handful of cafes, an IGA Supermarket, butcher shop, two bakeries, a newsagent, takeaway shops, multiple hairdressers, several massage parlours, a funeral parlour, a car wash and a post office. There is plenty of parking, and the main shopping precinct is opposite the Heathmont railway station. The distant Mount Dandenong and Dandenong Ranges are visible from much of this shopping strip.

== Demographics ==
=== Birth country ===
At the 2021 Census, the top four countries of birth were:

- Australia (74.8%)
- England (3.4%)
- China (2.8%)
- India (2.5%)

=== Language used at home ===
The top four languages used at home include:

- English (80%)
- Mandarin (3.9%)
- Cantonese (1.7%)
- Hindi (0.7%)

=== Religious affiliation ===
The top four religious affiliations include:

- No religion (46.9%)
- Catholic (17.7%)
- Anglican (7.3%)
- Baptist (4.1%)

=== Income and work ===
The median weekly income of Heathmont residents was $908, and for families was $2566.

The four largest occupational groupings were:

- Professionals (31.9%)
- Managers (14.7%)
- Clerical and administrative workers (12.7%)
- Technicians and trades workers (11.8%)

The unemployment rate was at 3.5%, below the national average of 5.1%.

== Politics and representation ==
Heathmont contained four voting booths at the 2010 federal election, all lying within the federal electorate of Deakin. Three of those booths saw the Liberal candidate win the most primary votes, yet only two saw the Liberals win a majority of two-party preferred votes after preferences. The combined booth results across the suburb saw the primary vote split 40.1% to Labor, 41.4% to the Liberals and 12.7% to the Greens. After preferences, the split was 52.5% to Labor and 47.5% to the Liberals. The suburb tends to be highly competitive electorally and is generally a reliable barometer for the overall voting population. Heathmont and surrounding areas were visited by federal politicians Joe Hockey, Kevin Rudd, Tony Abbott and Wayne Swan throughout 2010. In 2007, Heathmont was identified as one of the 'wealthier pockets' of Deakin (along with Blackburn and Vermont) in an analysis of marginal 'leafy' suburbs in Melbourne's east, that were, by swinging to Labor, proving wrong the notion of a 'rich Lib, poor Labor' myth.

== Schools ==
=== Primary schools ===
- Heathmont East Primary School
- Great Ryrie Primary School
- Marlborough Primary School

=== Secondary schools ===
- Heathmont College

== Sport and recreation ==
There are many parks, such as H.E. Parker Reserve and a mini golf course. Dandenong Creek supports much wildlife, including birds and frogs, although swimming is not recommended. There is also a bike track, Dandenong Creek Trail, which runs along Dandenong Creek.

The suburb has an Australian Rules football team, the Heathmont Jets, competing in the Eastern Football League, and a lawn bowls club, Heathmont Bowls Club, that plays in the Eastern Ranges Bowls Region.

Heathmont has two tennis clubs: Heathmont Tennis Club and H.E. Parker Reserve. Other sporting facilities include a baseball club and a cricket club.

Golfers play at the Heathmont Par 3 Golf Course on Canterbury Road.

There are two Scout Groups: Heathmont and 3rd Heathmont. Both are located in reserves along the Dandenong Creek: 3rd Heathmont in H.E. Parker, and Heathmont in Kathleen Barrow.

== Churches ==
There are also many churches situated in Heathmont:

- Heathmont Baptist Church
- Heathmont Uniting Church Community Living Centre
- Heathmont Presbyterian Church
- Heathmont Christadelphians
- Maroondah Presbyterian Reformed Church

== See also ==
- City of Ringwood – Heathmont was previously within this former local government area.
- Heathmont railway station - located in the centre of the suburb on the Belgrave line
- Maroondah City Council - the municipality in which Heathmont resides
