= Spill the Wine =

1970 single by Eric Burdon and War

Single by Eric Burdon & War

from the album Eric Burdon Declares "War"
- B-side: "Magic Mountain"
- Released: May 1970
- Genre: Progressive soul; funk; Latin; psychedelic rock; blues rock; spoken word; psychedelic funk
- Length: 4:51 (album version); 3:59 (promo single version)
- Label: MGM
- Songwriters: Charles Miller, Howard E. Scott, B.B. Dickerson, Lonnie Jordan, Harold Ray Brown, Thomas "Papa Dee" Allen, Lee Oskar, Eric Burdon
- Producer: Jerry Goldstein

Eric Burdon & War singles chronology
"Spill the Wine" (1970)	"Tobacco Road" (1970)

"Spill the Wine" is the debut single by singer Eric Burdon and the band War, released in May 1970. It was backed by the non-album track "Magic Mountain", and was War's first Billboard chart hit.

== Song description and history ==
"Spill the Wine" first appeared on the album Eric Burdon Declares War and runs 4:51. Its writing credits include the members of War: Papa Dee Allen, Harold Brown, Eric Burdon, B.B. Dickerson, Lonnie Jordan, Charles Miller, Lee Oskar, and Howard E. Scott. The song was inspired by an accident in which keyboardist Lonnie Jordan spilled wine on a mixing board. It features a prevalent flute solo, and the sound of a woman speaking Spanish—a friend of Eric Burdon's—is heard in the background. An edited version, released as a promo single for radio stations and subsequently included on most compilations, omits the middle spoken recitation, plus one chorus. The song was re-released as a single in 1996, after a remix by Junior Vasquez.

== Chart performance ==
"Spill the Wine" was War's first hit of two with Eric Burdon as vocalist. It peaked at number 3 on the Billboard Hot 100. Billboard ranked the single the number 20 song of 1970. It was also a top 3 hit in Canada and number 2 in Australia in mid-November 1970.

== Charts ==
=== Weekly charts ===
Chart (1970)	Peak position
Australia Go-Set	2
Canada RPM Top Singles	3
Germany	28
Mexico	5
Netherlands	15
New Zealand (Listener)	10
US Billboard Hot 100	3
US Cash Box Top 100	1

=== Year-end charts ===
Chart (1970)	Rank
Australia	18
Canada	44
US Billboard Hot 100	20
US Cash Box Top 100	15

== Certifications ==
Region	Certification	Certified units/sales
United States (RIAA)	Gold	1,000,000^{^}
^{^} Shipments figures based on certification alone.

== Use in media ==
=== Films ===
"Spill the Wine" has been used in the soundtracks of the following motion pictures:

- Boogie Nights (1997)
- Deuce Bigalow: Male Gigolo (1999)
- Remember the Titans (2000)

=== Television ===
The song was used in the following television episodes:

- The Fresh Prince of Bel-Air, episode "That's No Lady, That's My Cousin" (sung by Uncle Phil)
- Dexter, season 6, episode 4, "A Horse of a Different Color" (while characters Joey Quinn and Angel Batista are smoking marijuana)
- Shameless, episode "Requiem for a Slut"
- Suits, episode "Sour Grapes"

== Cover versions ==
=== 1970s through 1990s ===
"Spill the Wine" has been covered by:

- Melvin Sparks, on his Sparks! album (1970)
- The Isley Brothers, on their Givin' It Back album (1971)
- 2nu on their Ponderous album (1989)
- Lighter Shade of Brown on their Brown & Proud album (1990)
- Freaked Out Flower Children on their 1991 album Love In; reached number 31 on the Australian ARIA Singles Chart.
- Michael Hutchence on the Barb Wire soundtrack (1996).

=== 2000s–2010s ===
In 2001, The B-Side Players included a cover on their album Movement. The same year, Los Mocosos included a version on their album Shades of Brown.

In 2004, flautist Alexander Zonjic performed a cover of "Spill the Wine" for his album Seldom Blues.

San Francisco band Vinyl covered "Spill the Wine" on their album Frogshack Music Volume II in 2009, in a track featuring Sugar Pie DeSanto and Marcus Scott.

The revival of the 1970s band The L.A. Carpool covered "Spill the Wine" with a Latin salsa flair in 2012, in a track that featured well-known Latin drummer Richie "Gajate" Garcia and other well-known Latin musicians.

On October 31, 2013, jam band Widespread Panic covered the song, opening the second set of their show at UNO arena in New Orleans, and again at Philips Arena in Atlanta, Georgia on New Year's Eve of 2013.

On February 23, 2014, Bruce Springsteen and the E Street Band opened their concert at the Hope Estate Winery in the Hunter Valley of NSW, Australia, with a nine-minute version of the song, the world premiere of their version.

In 2019, the song was released as the lead single from the compilation album Mystify: A Musical Journey with Michael Hutchence.
