= List of George Lopez episodes =

George Lopez is an American television sitcom that ran on the American Broadcasting Company (ABC) from March 27, 2002, to May 8, 2007, broadcasting a total of 120 episodes over six seasons.

== Series overview ==
Season	Episodes	Originally released		Rank	Viewers (in millions)
Season	Episodes	First released	Last released	Rank	Viewers (in millions)
1	4	March 27, 2002	April 17, 2002	70	9.0
2	24	October 2, 2002	May 14, 2003	50	10.4
3	28	September 26, 2003	May 21, 2004	96	7.4
4	24	September 28, 2004	May 17, 2005	79	7.2
5	22	October 5, 2005	April 12, 2006	82	7.2
6	18	January 24, 2007	May 8, 2007	95	6.1

== Episodes ==
=== Season 1 (2002) ===
No. overall	No. in season	Title	Directed by	Written by	Original release date	Prod. code	U.S. viewers (millions)
1	1	"Prototype"	Barnet Kellman	Bruce Helford, George Lopez & Robert Borden	March 27, 2002	475181	10.43
When well-liked George (George Lopez) becomes the first guy to be promoted from the assembly line to plant manager at a Los Angeles airplane parts factory, his life becomes a little more complicated. His best friend Ernie (Valente Rodriguez) and fellow co-workers on the plant floor tease him about joining management. George's first test in the new position is to terminate one employee. He must choose between either his acerbic line-inspector mother, Benny (Belita Moreno), or Ernie. George's hardworking and patient wife Angie (Constance Marie) copes with Benny's constant wisecracks and cares for the couple's kids, precocious 9-year-old Max (Luis Armand Garcia) and 13-year-old Carmen (Masiela Lusha), who is dealing with the traumas of being a teenager.
2	2	"Curious George"	Andy Cadiff	Dailyn Rodriguez	April 3, 2002	175101	8.96
George worries about Carmen when she brings a boy home for the first time. He persuades Max to spy on them, but despite finding no impropriety, George threatens Duncan (Jonathon Jones), embarrassing Carmen. Later, George replies to instant messages on Carmen's computer, pretending to be her. Although this infuriates both Carmen and Angie when they find out, George goes to a party and further humiliates Carmen with his over-protectiveness. Finally, Carmen ends the relationship with Duncan, not because of her father, but because Duncan tries to pressure her into having sex too soon. Carmen forgives George, who realizes that she is more responsible than he thought.
3	3	"Happy Birthdays"	Philip Charles MacKenzie	Lawrence Bloch	April 10, 2002	175102	9.33
Much to George's unpleasant surprise, Angie and his family throw him a very belated surprise birthday party that he assumes is Max's upcoming birthday party. Meanwhile, a new worker, accident-prone Amy (Sandra Bullock, one of the executive producers of the series), joins the crew at Power Bros. Aviation and threatens the pride George takes in his workplace's safety record.
4	4	"Max's Big Adventure"	Lee Shallat-Chemel	George Lopez & Rick Nyholm	April 17, 2002	175103	7.36
George and Benny find themselves holding open auditions for workers to replace Reggie's position in the factory's carpool, after Reggie gets arrested for fighting in a bar the night before. Meanwhile, George tries to prove to Angie that Max is not ready to walk to school on his own when Angie insists on George letting him do so.

=== Season 2 (2002–03) ===
No. overall	No. in season	Title	Directed by	Written by	Original release date	Prod. code	U.S. viewers (millions)
5	1	"Who's Your Daddy?"	Lee Shallat-Chemel	Rachel Sweet	October 2, 2002	175402	11.44
Angie chastises George for telling Max fabricated stories about his deceased father, Manny (Esai Morales). Later, while shopping with Benny, George meets his aunt Cecelia (Olga Merediz) who tells him his father is actually alive and living in northern California. When George attempts to track his father down, Benny tries to discourage George by lying to him, claiming Manny never held George as a baby. Aunt Cecelia later visits the Lopez residence and gives George a picture of Manny holding him. Meanwhile, Angie buys a dog – which Max names Mr. Needles – off a homeless man because the dog needs veterinary help.
6	2	"Token of Unappreciation"	Lee Shallat-Chemel	Rick Nyholm	October 9, 2002	175403	11.76
George’s loyalty to Powers Aviation is tested when his bosses, Mel and Jack, disrespect him by treating him like a personal assistant. Tempted by a vice presidency offer from a rival firm, Aerocorp, George meets with their president, Ben Adams (James Lesure). Although Ben appears professional, George quickly realizes the offer is disingenuous when Ben reveals he only wants to hire George to fill an ethnic quota (Which was due to George being a Latino.) Ben even encourages George to act untouchable, demonstrating his own perceived immunity by slapping their white CEO's rear and calling him a "cracker". George ultimately rejects the job, preferring to work on the line than be a "token." Meanwhile, Carmen struggles with her conscience when a group of "cool" girls invites her to join them but pointedly excludes her best friend, Toby.
7	3	"The Show Dyslexic"	Philip Charles MacKenzie	Robert Borden	October 16, 2002	175405	12.74
George initially resists a diagnosis that Max has dyslexia, fearing the stigma of special education and that his son will be bullied. However, after Angie suggests the condition may be genetic, George is forced to confront his own lifelong struggle with reading and writing. After witnessing Max’s mounting frustration and academic decline, George admits his own dyslexia in a rare moment of vulnerability. When Max objects to the special education classes, George insists he attend, emphasizing that Max needs the tools for success so he does not end up like George when he's older. Meanwhile, Ernie feels exploited when his new girlfriend consistently leaves him to babysit her children, forcing him to reconsider the relationship.
8	4	"Halloween Cheer"	Philip Charles MacKenzie	Jim Hope	October 23, 2002	175404	12.24
As George prepares the house for Halloween, Carmen falls into a depression after her best friend, Toby, moves away. Her rebellious behaviour peaks when George, Angie, and Benny catch her smoking a cigarette in her bedroom. In an attempt to help her make new friends, Angie encourages her to join the school's Pep Squad. However, the cheerleaders bully Carmen, causing her to lash out at Angie before eventually finding her place in the Poetry Club. Meanwhile, George faces a professional crisis when his bosses order him to fire Reggie, an assembly line worker whose personal life is a complete wreck. George's guilt over the firing nearly ruins his holiday spirit, forcing Ernie and Max to navigate the Halloween festivities while George struggles with his conscience.
9	5	"The Unnatural"	Joe Regalbuto	Frank Pace & Mike Upchurch	October 30, 2002	175406	11.63
When Max's baseball coach asks George to have Max sit out the next game because he isn't good enough, George tries to help Max improve at a batting cage, only to realize he is equally terrible at the sport. The situation escalates when Max accidentally allows the family dog, Mr. Needles, to chew up George's prized 1978 All-Star game baseball, autographed by Steve Garvey, Jim Palmer, Rod Carew, and Joe Morgan. George’s fury leads Angie to warn him that he is being too hard on Max. Later, George has a vivid dream where his bobblehead dolls of the four legendary players come to life. The athletes—appearing as themselves—confront George, telling him that he is pushing Max too hard and that the boy may not even like baseball. Upon waking, George has a heart-to-heart with Max, who admits he doesn't enjoy the game, and George gives him his blessing to quit.
10	6	"No Free Launch"	Gerry Cohen	Luisa Leschin	November 6, 2002	175408	11.43
At a PTA meeting, Accident-Prone Amy (Sandra Bullock) becomes secretary and is in charge of candy sales for a trip to the Space Shuttle launch, and reveals that her daughter is in Max's class. When George, Angie, and Max fail to meet the quota of $480, the PTA moms demand that the Lopez family write a check. George refuses, partly because George doesn't believe they need to go to the Space Shuttle launch and partly because George has little spending money to begin with. In the end, Max doesn't go on the trip when George burns the check after the PTA called him "poor". George and Max watch the launch at home on TV, however (much to their joy), the launch is canceled and they instead watch wrestling. Elsewhere, Benny seeks a makeover from Carmen because of a guy she has met, until she finds out he is married.
11	7	"The Wedding Dance"	Lee Shallat-Chemel	Dailyn Rodriguez	November 13, 2002	175401	11.54
Angie and George offer their backyard for the wedding reception of George's friend, Frank (Mel Rodriguez) and his bride, Kathy Despite the celebration, George's persistent refusal to dance creates tension with Angie, who remarks, "I see him and Kathy are finally gonna tie the knot," George’s refusal to dance causes friction, especially after Frank and the guys call George a "wuss" at the bachelor party for his stance. To cope with her frustration, Angie drinks excessively, resulting in an embarrassing scene where she performs erratic, drunken dance moves—including spanking George on the floor. Meanwhile, Ernie and a factory co-worker named Ginger (Paget Brewster) show a mutual attraction and dance together at the party. Throughout the festivities, George continues his search for his father.
12	8	"Love Bites"	Gerry Cohen	John R. Morey & Allen J. Zipper	November 20, 2002	175407	13.45
When When Carmen comes home with a hickey from her boyfriend, Adam, George and Angie are furious. They punish her and track Adam down to confront him, leading to a physical altercation between George and Adam's father. Meanwhile, after a single mother at the park mistakenly assumes Max is Ernie's son, Ernie decides to use Max as "bait" to meet women by pretending to be a devoted single father. This backfires when Max eventually gets tired of the scheme and exposes him.
13	9	"Guess Who's Coming to Dinner, Honey"	Barnet Kellman	John R. Morey	November 27, 2002	175410	9.68
After learning Benny had a one-night stand with a co-worker, Lalo (Cheech Marin), 35 years ago, George believes Lalo to be his real father. George meets Lalo (whose picture bears a striking resemblance to George) who turns out to be gay with his partner Charles (John Michael Higgins), and invites him over for Thanksgiving dinner. However, Benny tells George that they never had sex, and that Lalo is not his real father. After further questioning Lalo, he tells George that he only took care of Benny when she got drunk on tequila and passed out.
14	10	"Charity"	Barnet Kellman	Jim Hope & Dailyn Rodriguez	December 4, 2002	175411	11.33
When Angie finds she has more free time around the house, she volunteers for a variety of charities. Feeling invincible, she soon finds herself joining more organizations than she can handle, and George and the family must help Angie to keep her from being overwhelmed. Meanwhile, Angie convinces Power Brothers to hire an underprivileged former gang member named Marisol, and her disrespectful, slacking attitude provides hard work for everyone. Angie's charity work eventually proves to be too much when Max fakes vomit in school in order to get out of a test. After scolding their son, Max tells his parents that he wasn't ready for the test because Angie could not make time to help him study. In the end, Angie drops all of her charity work to focus more on her family.
15	11	"Meet the Cuban Parents"	Lee Shallat-Chemel	Michele Serros	December 11, 2002	175413	11.06
When Angie's parents, Victor (Emiliano Díez) and Emelina Palmero (Sônia Braga), come to visit the family for Christmas, George thinks they still believe that he is not good enough for their daughter, so he decides to show that he can take care of his family without their help and challenges Victor to a contest to see who can have the best Christmas. The rivalry escalates until Angie reaches her breaking point; she reveals that her parents' visits cause her physical stress and she is tired of playing the peacemaker. She gives her father an ultimatum: reconcile with George or leave the house. While preparing the lechón (a traditional Cuban roasted suckling pig) in the backyard, a stubborn Vic finally offers a backhanded compliment, admitting George didn't "screw up" the holiday. Fed up with years of put-downs, George finally confronts Vic, demanding to know when he will admit that George didn't ruin Angie's life. Vic confesses his coldness stemmed from his own heartbreak; he saw George—with his long hair and Black Sabbath T-shirts—as the "no-future" kid who took away his "little girl." However, Vic finally acknowledges that George has become a good man and a worthy husband for Angie. The two men shake hands and reconcile, with Vic finally giving George the respect he has sought for years.
16	12	"This Old Casa"	Lee Shallat-Chemel	Rick Nyholm	January 8, 2003	175412	10.96
Fed up with being unappreciated by Benny, and with the urging of Angie, George decides to remodel his mother's badly deteriorated bathroom. Hoping for a simple "thank you," George's plan initially backfires as Benny continues to be entirely ungrateful. In a rare moment of vulnerability, Benny reveals that she finds it difficult to show appreciation because of her own hardships, leading to a heart-to-heart talk. However, when Benny discovers that George installed a built-in ashtray in the shower, she finally softens and expresses her gratitude, telling him, "You did... that was nice." George and Benny realize their significance in each other's lives and, in turn, express their gratitude for one another—though Benny eventually undercuts the moment by telling George he "gives in too easy.
17	13	"Super Bowl"	Amanda Bearse	George Lopez & Bruce Helford	January 15, 2003	175415	11.11
The Lopez family discovers that Benny's estranged older brother, Joe (Ismael "East" Carlo), is in the hospital and dying of cancer. Benny initially refuses to see him due to a long-standing grudge over a lost bet, but George and Angie eventually convince her to visit him. Although Benny’s primary motivation is to secure Joe's highly-coveted Super Bowl tickets, her attitude shifts when she sees him on his deathbed; they end up laughing like children and peacefully bury the hatchet. Meanwhile, George struggles with his own fear of death. Because Benny never taught him healthy ways to cope with loss when he was a child, George finds himself unable to face the reality of the situation and has extreme difficulty attending his uncle's funeral.
18	14	"The Valentine's Day Massacre"	John Pasquin	Robert Borden	February 5, 2003	175416	10.28
When George gives Angie a hat as a disappointing gift for Valentine's Day, Angie has a flashback to high school in the 1980s when George painted a great mural of her for the holiday. When Angie takes the entire family to look at the mural, only to find out it will soon be torn down, the mural's true origin becomes known. It's later revealed by a construction worker that the mural was actually painted by an artist named Chanto Perez, not George, and that George wrote his signature on the mural using spray paint as graffiti to make Angie believe he painted it. After finding out the truth, Angie feels disappointed and starts arguing with George, which makes her think that George has been lying to her ever since. The next day, Ernie arrives at the Lopez house and shows them a mural on their garage. Ernie tells Angie that George painted it for her; however, Marisol shows up and confronts Ernie about the deal they'd made. Angie then realizes that Marisol is the one who painted the mural on the garage and not George, catching George in yet another lie. In the midst of their argument, however, it turns out that Angie also once lied to George; she and a friend named Carla once agreed to go out with George and Ernie merely as a joke, and this lie eventually led to George and Angie's marriage.
19	15	"Girl Fight"	Gerry Cohen	Luisa Leschin & Michele Serros	February 12, 2003	175414	11.22
Carmen breaks up with her classmate Adam, he retaliates by spreading a false rumor that they had sex, severely damaging her reputation at school. The situation worsens when Carmen's former friend and rival, Piper Morey (Autumn Reeser), vandalizes the Lopez home by writing "Carmen Hopez" on their sliding glass door. George and Angie attempt to intervene, but they are blocked by school counsellor Tommy "Rango" Durango (Steve Schirripa), —George’s childhood bully—who refuses to take action without evidence. Frustrated, Carmen takes matters into her own hands and fights Piper at school, resulting in Carmen's suspension. However, the situation shifts when Adam unexpectedly confesses to Rango that he witnessed Piper instigate the fight. Rango subsequently reverses Carmen's suspension and punishes Piper instead. Despite the "good news," a devastated Carmen refuses to return to school. She plays a harassing message from the family's answering machine and reveals the extent of the abuse she has faced, including being followed into the restroom and having her clothes pulled in the hallway. When George offers to have every offending student suspended, Carmen tearfully points out that the damage to her reputation is irreparable. Realizing that the school environment is no longer safe or healthy for her, George and Angie agree to withdraw Carmen from public school and enroll her in a private school.
20	16	"George vs. George"	John Pasquin	Jim Hope & John R. Morey	February 26, 2003	175417	10.60
George and Angie apply for a loan for Carmen's private school, only to discover that they have bad credit. George believes this is a mistake, but finds out that there actually is another George Lopez (Lou Diamond Phillips) who owns a skateboard shop. When George finds the other George and confronts him, he is shocked to find they have the same birthday, social security number, and father. Both Georges then realize that they are half brothers. Upon learning this, George invites George II over for dinner, where George II reveals that he came from a poor family, has no money, and had dropped out of high school, prompting George to help put his brother. Some time later, however, the bank calls the Lopez house looking for George II, saying that Arizona State University needs him to pay back his student loan, revealing that George II actually went to college. When George confronts George II about that, he finds that their father, Manny, is actually rich. He also learns that George II simply wanted money after exhausting his trust fund, causing an infuriated George to disown his brother.
21	17	"A Kiss is Just a Kiss"	Barnet Kellman	Jay Kogen & Ann Serano Lopez	March 5, 2003	175418	10.06
George’s attempt to surprise Angie for her birthday by inviting her father, Vic, and sister, Gloria,(Jacqueline Obradors) backfires when a jealous Gloria makes an unwanted advance toward him in the garage. Although George rejects her, the encounter is witnessed by Max. In an effort to avoid ruining the birthday, George instructs Max to wait until Gloria has "left" before telling Angie. However, Max interprets this literally and "lets the cat out of the bag" just as Gloria is stepping off the porch to head to the airport. A furious Angie chases Gloria down, leading to a physical altercation on the front lawn. After returning inside, Angie confirms to a stunned George and Max that Gloria confessed and apologized—after which Angie "gave her her hair back." Ultimately, the incident reaffirms Angie’s trust in George’s loyalty despite the family turmoil.
22	18	"Profiles in Courage"	Andrew Tsao	George Lopez	March 12, 2003	175409	10.73
Powers Bros. Aviation is under consideration by the federal government for a major defense contract. Fearing that the Middle Eastern background of an inspector named Hosni (Jason Antoon), will jeopardize the deal, George’s bosses order him to demote Hosni to a desk job. George is forced to decide whether to sacrifice his principles or risk his career and the potential jobs of 20 other workers by standing up for Hosni. Meanwhile, Max "marries" a classmate named Allison (Demetra Raven) at school. However, their "marriage" quickly ends in "divorce" after Max gives her a piece of gum as an anniversary present, causing her to storm off in anger.
23	19	"Secrets and Lies"	Joe Regalbuto	David Grubstick	March 26, 2003	175420	9.41
When Benny learns that Manny, George’s father, is now wealthy, she decides she deserves to get rich herself. After returning from her lunch break drunk, she falls down on factory premises and pretends to be seriously injured to file a large workman's compensation claim. However, when Benny discovers she will only receive a mere $375, she decides to hire a lawyer and sue Powers Brothers Aviation for $1,000,000. George is forced to beg his mother to drop the dishonest lawsuit, as it jeopardizes his own career. Meanwhile, Benny continues her ongoing rivalry with her co-worker, Gina (Elmarie Wendel).
24	20	"Girls Night Out"	Barnet Kellman	Luisa Leschin & Dailyn Rodriguez & Allen J. Zipper	April 2, 2003	175419	8.64
George is shocked when Angie takes further pity on Marisol and allows her to live in the Lopez home, instead of with her abusive boyfriend. Later, after impressionable Carmen becomes intrigued with Marisol's lifestyle begins, Angie admits that she may have made a mistake. Meanwhile, Max joins a scouting troop, but is not learning what he should from it; instead, he is taught about how annoying "tree huggers" are, and even asks George about getting a gun permit. George then decides hosts the next scout meeting at the house, wherein he discovers that Max's scoutmaster is a right wing conservative, as he constantly goes into rants over anything remotely related to a scout activity. George eventually confronts the scoutmaster and calls him out for influencing the kids in the wrong way.
25	21	"I Only Have Eyes on You"	Joe Regalbuto	Jim Hope & Rick Nyholm	April 23, 2003	175423	8.04
When Max is caught peeping on Carmen's friend Olivia (Ashley Tisdale) changing from a hole between his and Carmen's room, Carmen sprays him in the eye with perfume. However, instead of George punishing Max for peeping, he punishes Carmen for spraying Max's eye. Carmen then decides to get revenge on Max by taking a picture of him sleeping in his underwear while hugging a stuffed pink rabbit and posting the photo around his school. This leads to Max being beaten up and Carmen is punished once again. Eventually, Angie makes George realize that he is showing preference for one child over the other. Upon realizing this, George then apologizes to Carmen, waiving her punishment and even buys her a cell phone.
26	22	"Team Leader"	Joe Regalbuto	Spiro Skentzos	April 30, 2003	175422	8.33
George is tasked by his bosses to give employee evaluations, but does not know what to put for Ernie. When Benny tells George that the "evaluations" are simply to see which employee will be laid off, George gives Ernie a perfect score, hoping to save his friend's job. However, it's revealed that the top four employees with the highest scores will be promoted to team leader - which, thanks to George, includes Ernie. George must now decide to either reveal the truth about Ernie's performance, which could cost him his job; or allow Ernie to keep the team leader position, which could become a detriment to the whole factory. Meanwhile, Angie learns how to sell make-up products. In the end, Ernie proves his worth to George and upper management, getting to keep both his job and position as team leader.
27	23	"George Has Two Mommies"	Joe Regalbuto	Robert Borden & Rachel Sweet	May 7, 2003	175421	9.24
As the bills from Allendale Prep, Carmen's private school, continue to pile up, George and Angie believe that all of their financial problems will be solved by Angie's new career of selling cosmetics. But when Max and his troublemaking friend Ricky (J. B. Gaynor) light a bottle rocket that lands on the Lopez's garage, causing it to catch on fire, Angie's LaMarie cosmetics are destroyed. To make matters worse, George finds out that it will cost $17,000 to repair the garage. Looking to help her family, Benny travels to Phoenix to meet Manny's new wife and George II's mother, Lydia (Cristina Saralegui), seeking assistance.
28	24	"Long Time No See"	John Pasquin	Story by : Dailyn Rodriguez; Teleplay by : Luisa Leschin & John R. Morey	May 14, 2003	175424	8.47
After Benny successfully convinces Manny to give George a check for $20,000 to save the Lopez family from financial ruin, George vows to visit Manny in Phoenix. George's difficult personal journey then becomes a family vacation when everyone else decides to go. Along the way, George reminisces about his upbringing. After years of searching, George finally meets his father, Manny (William Marquez). However, upon learning that his father is not at all what he expected him to be, George rips up Manny's check and gives it back to him. When Manny then makes an deeply insulting comment about Benny, George punches his father in the face, and the Lopez family head back home to California. Meanwhile, back at home, Ernie is starting to get more success with meeting women. The band WAR performs the opening title.

=== Season 3 (2003–04) ===
No. overall	No. in season	Title	Directed by	Written by	Original release date	Prod. code	U.S. viewers (millions)
29	1	"Dubya, Dad and Dating" (Part 1)	John Pasquin	Rick Nyholm	September 26, 2003	176351	9.03
President George W. Bush comes to speak at Powers Brothers Aviation and everything becomes a mess. Jack wants George to cut his hair but George likes his hair the way it is. Benny has started dating a 42-year-old man named Randy (Nick Offerman) without telling George. During the president's speech, Carmen comes to the factory and disrupts it and George grounds her for a month for almost costing him his job. After the speech, George steals it from his desk. This results in the Secret Service coming to George's house to ask about the President's speech, but George doesn't admit to stealing it. Then, Jack forces George to cut his hair or he will show the camera footage of George taking the speech. George returns to the factory, and the police arrest him for punching Manny. In a special scene during the credits, George Lopez (as himself, not the character) tells the audience about a time he performed at the White House and did steal a speech from the president. When the Secret Service approached him, he says he blurted out "It's in the car!"
30	2	"Dubya, Dad and Dating" (Part 2)	John Pasquin	Rick Nyholm	September 26, 2003	176352	9.03
George is in jail for punching Manny. Manny comes to visit him and talk to him about why he left. He drops the charges and then George invites him for dinner so he can meet Angie and his grandchildren. Benny and Randy also go over to George's house that night to tell him that they are seeing each other. Benny is not happy to find out that he invited Manny to dinner because she doesn't want to see him again. George is not happy to find out that Benny and Randy are seeing each other. After Benny takes off and the kids go upstairs to give the adults space, George and Manny have a quiet dinner as Angie watches on with a smile.
31	3	"The Cuban Missus Crisis"	John Pasquin	John R. Morey	October 3, 2003	176353	7.61
Angie’s social life begins to pick up, leaving George feeling neglected. While she is out with friends, George discovers that Angie's mother had an affair and that her parents, Vic and Emelina, are getting a divorce. George becomes increasingly paranoid and, when Angie returns home late, he has a breakdown and accuses her of cheating. The tension is resolved when Vic arrives to break the news of the divorce, leading Angie to realize that George’s "crazy" behavior was actually caused by his fear for their own marriage.
32	4	"Feel the Burn"	John Pasquin	Luisa Leschin	October 10, 2003	176354	8.18
After Benny falls ill, a hospital visit reveals she has contracted an STD from her boyfriend, Randy. During a routine review of her medical history, George makes the startling discovery that he has a sister whom Benny gave up for adoption at birth. Despite Benny's fierce opposition, George tracks down his sister, Linda Lorenzo (Lisa Guerrero) a successful professional working at Max's school. Using their shared dyslexia as a cover, George introduces himself as a representative for a support group to observe her without revealing their connection. He discovers that Linda, raised by a supportive Italian-American family, led the fulfilling life George felt he was denied due to Benny's neglect. Realizing that introducing Linda to the toxic reality of their biological mother would only disrupt her happiness, George chooses to keep their relationship a secret, merely snapping a photograph to show his wife, Angie. Meanwhile, Vic’s attempt to reconcile with his estranged wife through Angie’s mediation ends in disaster, prompting Angie to finally confront her mother’s selfishness. The character of Linda Lorenzo, George's long-lost sister, was introduced in the season 3 episode "Feel the Burn," portrayed by (Lisa Guerrero). However, the role was recast for season 4, with (Eva LaRue) taking over the part starting with the episode "George Gets Assisterance."
33	5	"Carmen's Dating"	John Pasquin	Rachel Sweet	October 17, 2003	176355	8.61
Carmen introduces her first boyfriend, Jason (Bryan Fisher) prompting George and Angie to implement a strict "home-only" dating policy after an intense interview. While George is thrilled with the arrangement, Angie becomes suspicious of Jason’s willingness to stay indoors. The truth surfaces during homecoming: Jason, concerned with his social status, refuses to be seen in public with Carmen—an arrangement Carmen had secretly accepted. Outraged by the blow to his daughter's self-esteem, George forbids the relationship. However, after a week apart, Jason realizes Carmen is more important than his reputation, and the two reconcile. Meanwhile, Vic continues to wear out his welcome while living with the Lopezes during his marital separation. After Benny bluntly labels him a burden, Vic regains his pride and announces he has secured his own apartment.
34	6	"Split Decision"	John Pasquin	Paul A. Kaplan & Mark Torgrove	October 24, 2003	176356	8.33
Everyone at Powers Brothers aviation goes to Thirsties to celebrate a new contract. George lets it slip that Mel went to Vegas with Jack's ex-wife when they were together. Jack and Mel get into a fight that results in them splitting up the company. Each of them want George to be a part of their company, and George has a hard time choosing between them. In the end, they make up and stay together. They then find out about a plane crash, which resulted in two deaths, and that the factory's landing gear might be responsible. Meanwhile, Carmen gets invited to go on a ski trip and George and Angie won't let her go, but they change their minds and she ends up going.
35	7	"No One Gets Out Alive"	John Pasquin	Richard Goodman	October 31, 2003	176358	7.34
It is Halloween, and all of the workers are worried about the plane crash. An inspector from the NTSB comes to the factory, interviews George and Benny, and then shuts down the factory while they inspect the landing gear. All of the workers are worried about losing their jobs, so George turns his house into a haunted tomb of terror to help raise money for the inspection, while Benny feels responsible for the plane crash.
36	8	"Bringing Home The Bacon"	John Pasquin	Dailyn Rodriguez	November 7, 2003	176359	8.51
Carmen is turning 15 and she wants to have a quinceañera. George wants to cancel the quinceañera because money is tight since he is not working, but Angie says it's her money and starts to make money decisions without George's consent. Meanwhile, Carmen is debating about what to say to Jason in her speech. Carmen ends up having her quinceañera, but Jason breaks up with her for saying how much he means to her. In the end, they find out that the factory's landing gear is not responsible for the crash, and the factory is re-opened.
37	9	"Fishing Cubans"	John Pasquin	John R. Morey	November 14, 2003	176357	7.86
For his wedding anniversary, George is persuaded by Vic to help smuggle Vic’s brother, Octavio, out of Cuba after the government revokes his exit visa. Along with Ernie, the trio embarks on a dangerous sea mission to rescue Octavio from the ocean, successfully evading the U.S. Coast Guard. Back home, George’s attempt to celebrate the reunion by dressing as Fidel Castro backfires, terrifying the brothers during a card game. In a comedic B-plot, Benny encourages Max to host a fraudulent "birthday party" for his special education classmates to solicit gifts for a video game he cannot afford. The scam nearly succeeds until a late-arriving student exposes the ruse to Angie. As punishment, Angie forces Max to return the gifts and give away one of his own toys; Max gleefully parts with a difficult polar bear puzzle Angie had bought to replace the game.
38	10	"Would You Like a Drumstick or a Kidney?"	John Pasquin	Luisa Leschin	November 21, 2003	176360	7.49
George invites his father, Manny, along with Manny’s wife, Lydia, and George’s half-brother, George II o spend Thanksgiving with the family. During the visit, George II reveals that Manny is in desperate need of a kidney transplant and that he originally planned to be the donor. However, when tests reveal that George II is not a match, the responsibility falls on George. While Manny and Lydia pressure him to donate, Angie, Benny, and Max strongly object, fearing for George's health. After weighing the risks against the chance to finally bond with his father, George decides to go through with the donation to save Manny's life.
39	11	"Mementos"	John Pasquin	Dailyn Rodriguez	November 28, 2003	176361	8.58
George throws out a box of Angie's grandmother's mementos because he thought it was just a box of trash. Angie gets mad at him because it was all she had left to remember her grandmother by. George is about to donate a kidney to Manny, but then Manny dies before he can. Manny leaves behind a gold watch for George passed down from his father, but also a letter asking George not to go to his funeral, as he does not want his friends and family to know he abandoned George and Benny. Enraged by this, George then smashes the watch with a meat mallet, shortly before Benny tells him it was worth a lot; as the watch itself is not usable anymore, they can still sell it for its worth in gold. Meanwhile, Carmen gets a job working at the restaurant that George worked at as a teenager.
40	12	"Christmas Punch"	John Pasquin	Jim Hope	December 12, 2003	176362	7.04
Max is eaves dropping on a phone call where George and Angie were discussing what to get Max for Christmas. At this point he starts to doubt Santa's existence, but George tries to get him to continue believing in Santa because Benny ruined Santa for George. Then one kid starts beating up Max for believing in Santa. At this point, Angie wants to tell Max the truth about Santa so he won't get beaten up, but George still wants Max to believe in Santa. In the end, Max still believes in Santa. Meanwhile, Carmen and Jason get back together and they start kissing but George doesn't approve.
41	13	"Why You Crying?"	John Pasquin	Jim Hope	January 9, 2004	176363	8.36
A family crisis erupts when Benny slaps Max for his insolence, sparking a heated debate between George and Angie over physical discipline. Tensions rise further after a parent-teacher conference reveals Max is failing the fifth grade and has been forging Angie's signature on his reports. Trying to reach his son, George has an earnest heart-to-heart where he explains how hard he struggled in school and how proud he was to be the first Lopez in the family to graduate. However, Max rejects the advice, cruelly asking why he should bother studying if it only leads to a "loser job" in a factory like George’s. A devastated George tells Max he is "done with him" and emotionally withdraws. The conflict only resolves when Max realizes the weight of his words and the fear George has of him becoming a failure. Max ultimately signs a contract promising George and Angie that he will try harder in school. The episode ends with a characteristic "apology" from Benny, who gives Max a cash bribe to make up for the slap.
42	14	"The Trouble with Ricky"	Joe Regalbuto	Allen J. Zipper	January 23, 2004	176365	8.35
When Max attempts to hide his friend Ricky in the house, George and Angie discover that Ricky’s mother, Wendy, is struggling with severe alcoholism and neglect. Against George's wishes, a sympathetic Angie initially allows Ricky to stay, but she quickly reverses her stance after the boys skip school and crash the family car into a fence. Realizing that Ricky's influence is a threat to Max's safety, Angie demands he leave. However, upon witnessing Ricky’s bleak living conditions—finding Wendy drunk in a hotel room where she confuses George for the pizza guy—George learns she is in a tailspin because she just broke up with her boyfriend. Moved by Ricky’s "crappy childhood" that mirrors his own, George impulsively offers to let him stay permanently—a move Angie ultimately blocks. In a surprising turn, Ernie offers to become Ricky's legal foster parent, moving the boy into his parents' home and vowing to make a positive difference in his life.
43	15	"God Needles George"	John Pasquin	Paul A. Kaplan & Mark Torgrove	February 6, 2004	176364	7.95
The family dog Mr. Needles is sick, so the family takes him to the vet, and they find out he has a tumor. The family plans to put him to sleep, but George promises God he would crawl on his knees up the cobblestone path to the Church of the Virgin of Guadalupe in Mexico (after Ernie tells him about a guy who did that and had his prayer was answered), if Mr. Needles gets better. Surprisingly, Mr. Needles' tumor disappears, much to George's dismay as it means he has to keep his promise; he attempts to get out of it by donating a small amount of money to the church. However, the pastor tells him it's not enough. With no options left, George goes to Mexico, where NUMEROUS other people are doing the same thing; possibly the church grants the prayers of those who promise to do this, but for George, it's more like a curse as he only promised to do so to make Max feel better.
44	16	"Benny and Randy"	Joe Regalbuto	Robert Borden	February 13, 2004	176367	7.27
Benny and Randy have been dating for six months, and Angie plans a celebratory dinner for them. During the evening, Randy asks Benny to take their relationship to the next level(by moving in together), and giving her a key to his apartment. A commitment-wary Benny flees, leading George to meddle by trying to "explain" his mother's abrasive personality to Randy. George's interference backfires when Randy decides to dump Benny. Furious, Benny turns her anger toward George, and surprisingly, Angie backs her up, criticizing George’s constant interference. Tensions peak when George informs Benny that Randy is already seeing another woman; in a fit of rage, Benny beats up Randy’s truck. The conflict resolves when George tricks Benny into admitting she truly cares for Randy and is simply afraid he will abandon her like George's father. Benny and Randy reconcile, and the episode ends with Randy proposing and Benny accepting.
45	17	"Weekend at Benny's"	Joe Regalbuto	David Grubstick	February 20, 2004	176366	7.70
Angie has to fill in for the La Marie sales manager in a conference in Vegas so George has to watch Carmen & Max. George decides to send them to stay with Benny for the weekend so they can endure his childhood as a way of dealing with some minor misbehavior from them. He takes Carmen's cell phone and Max's Game Boy away to ensure they have no way to escape Benny's attitude. They do okay at Benny's, but the slightest bit of criticism receives backlash. Angie ends up returning home earlier than George expected, and he attempts to keep his plan a secret. He soon admits his mistake, however, after she tells him that leaving the kids with Benny would be the worst idea he's ever had. He also finds a poster in Max's room listing 3 things Max plans to blackmail Carmen for doing, one of them being wearing a thong to school. Angie admits she gave Carmen permission to do it, whereas George is against it in the first place. When the kids return from Benny's, they serve George and Angie dinner and Angie admits that sending the kids to Benny's was a good idea. However, when George comments his food has too much garlic in it, Carmen and Max take the dinner away from them, telling them they can go hungry, as a display of Benny's earlier behavior.
46	18	"Jason Tutors Max"	Victor Gonzalez	Stacey Pulwer	February 27, 2004	176369	7.56
Max has a state test in three weeks and he is struggling with algebra. George and Angie couldn't help him, so they decided to get him a tutor. They try a few tutors including a very hot one named Ashley (Paris Hilton) and none of them work out. Then Jason decides to tutor him and Max starts to understand algebra, but Carmen doesn't like this because he already has too many extracurricular activities. Jason and Carmen then break up because of that. George and Angie want Jason to continue tutoring Max but Carmen doesn't want him around. In the end, Carmen and Jason get back together, and Max barely passes the state test.
47	19	"Angie Gets Tanked"	Joe Regalbuto	Richard Goodman	March 19, 2004	176368	7.10
George and Angie volunteer at a school fundraiser for students with disabilities, including Jason’s younger brother, Eric, who uses a wheelchair. George takes the "hot seat" at the dunk tank but is briefly replaced by Angie; a misunderstanding leads to Angie being dunked while wearing a white shirt. A revealing photograph of the incident quickly goes viral online, causing Carmen deep embarrassment at school. George and Angie eventually discover the "prank" was orchestrated by Eric. While Angie intends to confront him, she finds herself unable to scold a child with a disability and chooses to drop the matter. In a subplot, George’s habit of teasing a student named Lawrence about his weight leads to his expulsion from the fair; the principal subsequently mandates that George write a formal letter of apology.
48	20	"The Art of Boxing"	Joe Regalbuto	Jim Hope	March 26, 2004	176372	8.16
Max is having trouble sleeping because he is worried about failing the 5th grade. Vic suggests that Max takes boxing lessons to take his mind off school (supporting the suggestion by stating Max is a natural born fighter by being half Mexican and half Cuban), but George knows that Angie won't like the idea so they decide not to tell her until they are sure Max decides he likes it. It goes well and Max starts sleeping well. However, Max clumsily pulls his glove off too hard, resulting in his own black eye. They attempt to hide this when they get home, so enough time can pass for them to create an excuse. However, Angie wants to speak to Max; Vic tries to pass off the black eye as something he did when Max angered him, but Angie doesn't buy it. George reveals Max has been boxing, and Max goes to a tournament. However, Max turns away during a match and gets a good whack to the head that gives him a concussion. To Max's annoyance, his family keeps him awake and answering questions (despite the grade of concussion he has not being dangerous) all night.
49	21	"George's House of Cards"	Joe Regalbuto	Paul A. Kaplan & Mark Torgrove	April 2, 2004	176373	6.75
Angie convinces George to invite her father, Vic to his weekly poker game. After Vic loses and owes George $50, he refuses to pay, instead deducting the amount from George's long-standing debt for the garage. This sparks a feud, leading Vic to place a combination lock on the garage and refusing to give George the code. Vic does tell the combination to Max, but Max is unable to recall it due to his dyslexia, leaving the garage inaccessible. The conflict resolves when Vic admits he was taking out frustrations caused by his ex-wife, Emelina, on George. After Vic pays the debt, George reveals he fought so hard for the money because he considers Vic a father figure and wanted to be treated with respect. The episode ends with the tension seemingly resolved, though the dynamic of the poker game changes when Angie joins the table to play against the group.
50	22	"Dance Fever"	Joe Regalbuto	John R. Morey	April 9, 2004	176370	6.39
George wins an award at work for being the rising star in town among all the minorities. All of his co-workers are proud of him except for Benny. He then goes to Thirstie's with everyone to celebrate his award. He plays a new video game there called Pump It Up against Randy and gets mad at Benny for not appreciating his award. She then reveals her belief in "The Evil Eye", which is supposed to take away anything she loves; it's the reason she never was nice to George, because she caress about him. George decides to call the Evil Eye to get Benny as a way of taunting his mother's superstitions.
51	23	"She Drives Me Crazy"	Mark Cendrowski	Valentina Garza & Rachel Sweet	April 16, 2004	176375	6.89
Carmen gets her learner's permit and she wants to learn how to drive. She drives with Benny, and Benny gets caught drinking with Carmen driving, and Benny has to go to court. Benny then has to wear an embarrassing sign. Then George drives with Carmen and he yells at her making her nervous and she goes up a curb. Angie tells George he needs to be more patient and not yell. George tries driving with Carmen again, this time with more patience, but Carmen drives recklessly because Jason left her for another girl. (All in all, Carmen is not getting her licence any time soon)
52	24	"George Goes to Disneyland"	Joe Regalbuto	George Lopez	April 30, 2004	176374	7.00
Max wins an award at school for being the most improved special ed kid of the month. Angie rewards him by taking him to Disneyland. However, Ernie and Ricky come in saying that Ricky's foster hearing was on the same day but when they hear that The Lopez family was going to Disneyland Ricky sells George out by saying "There's no hearing, Ernie wanted me to lie to get Mr. Lopez out of something." Which angers Angie in the process. However, George tries to tell her that he doesn't want to go because he doesn't want to see what he missed as a child but then he changes his mind and he goes with Benny and looks for the rest of the group. They meet at the tea cup ride. Meanwhile, Mel's son Zack (Trevor Wright) falls for Carmen and follows her to Disneyland. George doesn't want the two to see each other. At first, Carmen doesn't like Zack because of what George said about him, but he buys her jewellery and she falls for him. At the end of the episode George goes to Disneyland again by himself. Note: This episode semi-breaks the fourth wall by addressing the viewers about spotting Disney Mickey Mouse logos, apparently promising a trip to Disneyland (now outdated). The logos can be spotted, with one such during the intro. This actually was a "watch-and-win" contest in real life made by George Lopez when the episode aired on April 30, 2004, in which viewers had a chance to win $10,000, a family trip to Disneyland, and other cool things by spotting all the Mickey Mouses, which were hidden throughout the episode. At the conclusion of the episode, viewers were asked to submit their results either to abc.com or mail them in for a chance to win. Due to the contest being over, this episode rarely is shown on reruns.
53	25	"Bachelor Party"	Joe Regalbuto	Rick Nyholm	May 7, 2004	176371	6.50
Benny and Randy are about to get married, they are planning their wedding and bachelor party. Accident Amy returns from the hospital (now blind and more oblivious to whats around her) and tries to win back Randy. George then catches them kissing and gets angry at Randy, but he refuses to tell Benny. Benny finds out from Angie about the kiss. Randy then has to choose between Benny and Amy and Benny and Randy break up. Note: Amy doesn't pursue Randy after this, suggesting she only was after him due to some kind of head trauma (as she is accident prone).
54	26	"Wrecking Ball"	Don Scardino	Richard Goodman & Spiro Skentzos	May 14, 2004	176376	6.58
Benny is still furious about her breakup with Randy, so she and Gina goes to Thirstie's and talk about how they both think that all men are bad. The next day, the factory was trashed, and everyone blames it on Benny because she was so mad about what Randy did. In the end, they find out that Benny is innocent and Zack did it as revenge to Mel. Meanwhile, Carmen is dating Zack behind George and Angie's back.
55	27	"What George Doesn't Noah..."	Joe Regalbuto	Robert Borden	May 21, 2004	176377	7.16
To hide her continued relationship with Zack Powers (Trevor Wright), Carmen pretends to date a new boy named Noah (Johnny Pacar) George and Benny become suspicious after reading a text on Noah's phone and follow him to a movie theater, where they catch him kissing another boy. Misinterpreting the situation, George believes Noah is "cheating" on Carmen and eventually sits her down for a heart-to-heart to tell her that her boyfriend is gay. The ruse falls apart when Noah comes over to the house and accidentally lets it slip that Carmen is actually still seeing Zack. Enraged by the deception, George and Angie's discovery sets the stage for the final confrontation in the following episode, "Now George Noah Ex-Zack-Ly What Happened," where they learn Carmen has run away from home.
56	28	"Now George Noahs Ex-Zack-Ly What Happened"	Joe Regalbuto	Luisa Leschin & Dailyn Rodriguez	May 21, 2004	176378	7.16
George and Angie find Carmen's diary and read that she's been dating Zack for quite a while; they also find out Carmen makes fun of George for his jerseys and Angie for trying to act younger than she is. When Carmen arrives home from school she tells them she is maturing and she can do whatever she wants, George snaps and tells her that if she can't live by their rules, she should just leave. The next morning Carmen tells George that she's sorry and that she'll stop seeing Zack. At Max's 5th grade graduation, Angie gets a call from Carmen, who says she's leaving for good with Zack and apologizes for not being the daughter they wanted. Meanwhile, Randy tries reuniting with Benny, and succeeds.

=== Season 4 (2004–05) ===
No. overall	No. in season	Title	Directed by	Written by	Original release date	Prod. code	U.S. viewers (millions)
57	1	"George Searches for a Needle in a Haight-Stack"	Joe Regalbuto	John R. Morey	September 28, 2004	177801	8.39
Carmen is calling George and Angie on their home phone, but hangs up upon reaching a verbal argument with her father.The season premiere opens with Carmen calling home from Zack’s phone, only to hang up after a heated verbal argument with George. While Carmen waits outside a liquor store, Zack emerges with a bottle of vodka, pressuring her to get drunk so he can have sex with her. Distraught, Carmen leaves him and ends up as a groupie for rapper Chingy and his entourage. George and Vic eventually track her down to a hotel suite in Haight-Ashbury, where George frightens the entourage into leaving by revealing Carmen is only 15. She finally returns home, but the problems aren't over yet. Carmen dismisses the dangers she faced, claiming George has "issues," which he admits while reminding her how lucky she is to have a stable home.. During a heated argument about the trip, Carmen admits she dumped Zack because George was right about his intentions, George doesn't believe her Carmen replies by saying: "You raised me better than that," and quoting his own rule: "Don’t do anything your mom and I will be ashamed of.". George shuts her down by confessing that he wasn't always the perfect father she’s quoting, as he was forced to work constantly just to keep the family afloat. Despite the tension, George and Angie find relief in the discovery that Carmen has not lost her virginity. The conflict intensifies when Carmen announces that since she is now a "woman," she will no longer call them "Mom" and "Dad," but "George and Angie." A stunned Angie asks, "Did she just call me Angie?" as Carmen further challenges their authority by "compromising" that while she won't go out tonight, she will definitely go out tomorrow. Despite the relief that Carmen is safe and has not lost her virginity, the episode ends with a cold war between parents and daughter.
58	2	"Landlord Almighty"	Joe Regalbuto	John R. Morey	October 5, 2004	177802	9.08
When Carmen crazily redecorates her room, George and Angie intervene and order her to stop doing so. Carmen then argues that she should be able to do to whatever she wants to her room since she is close to becoming an adult or she will run away again. Upon hearing this, George decides to treat her as a tenant of the family and orders her to pay rent for her room, pay bills and pay for her own food in an effort to discourage her from wanting to be treated like an adult. However, this plan soon backfires when Carmen doesn't relent and gets a roommate with a job. George, however, is determined the plan will work when Carmen's friend acts like her and takes her food, clothes, and money without asking. Carmen realizes this and kicks her roommate out, deciding to run away. Now sick of her behavior, Angie tells Carmen she can leave if she wants. After some thought, Carmen decides to stay and follow the rules.
59	3	"George of the Rings"	Joe Regalbuto	Paul A. Kaplan & Mark Torgrove	October 12, 2004	177803	8.54
After George forgets his and Angie's wedding anniversary, he goes to drastic measures to make it up to her when she gets revenge on him with a dirt cake. He takes her to a jewelry store at the mall to buy a proper wedding ring but the ring she picks is far out of George's price range. In order to get enough money to pay for it, he strikes up a deal with Vic to trade Emilina's engagement ring to George, in exchange for him giving Vic many of his possessions. When he shows the ring to Angie, she is exuberant, but Vic returns demanding Emilina's ring back. George is forced to tell Angie of his deal with Vic, which angers Angie. In another effort to make it up to her, George convinces her into having their wedding vows renewed.
60	4	"Home Sweet Homeschool"	Joe Regalbuto	Luisa Leschin	October 19, 2004	177804	8.59
After Allendale Preparatory refuses to readmit Carmen following her expulsion, Angie—who is out of work because her cosmetics employer, La Marie, went under—agrees to homeschool her. While Carmen initially expects a relaxed environment, Angie becomes overly zealous, turning every daily activity into a rigid lesson and even requiring Carmen to request bathroom breaks in French (who thought home schooling would be less like regular school and more relaxed.) leading to a heated argument where Carmen cruelly tells her, "Dad was right, you have nothing else going on in your life." George scolds Carmen for the remark, but later finds Angie looking through her past accolades, mourning the career she might have had. In a vulnerable moment, George uses a metaphor to comfort her, noting that when she met him, she "pushed the elevator button and went down" to his level to build a life together, a sentiment she initially resists hearing. Motivated to reclaim her professional identity, Angie decides to transition into a new career as a wedding planner. Meanwhile, the loss of Angie's income forces a postponement of the couple's wedding vow renewal ceremony wedding vow renewal. due to the financial strain.
61	5	"Leave It to Lopez"	Gerry Cohen	Paul A. Kaplan & Mark Torgrove	October 26, 2004	177807	8.70
When a janitor with no life insurance dies at work, Angie finds out that George has been lying and does not have life insurance either. As Angie hounds him and forbids him to have ice cream, he dozes off to classic TV which leads to a spoof of such classics as Leave It to Beaver, The Munsters and The Jetsons. Note: This episode was dedicated to the memory of Rodney Dangerfield.
62	6	"Sk8r Boyz"	Joe Regalbuto	Jim Hope	November 9, 2004	177806	8.50
Struggling to navigate the social pressures of middle school, Max seeks acceptance by joining a rebellious group of older skateboarders. The association quickly turns legal when Max is arrested at the mall for his involvement in a gang-related assault on a rival skater. After retrieving him from the police station, George After Max is arrested for assault at the mall, George confronts Max’s newfound defiance by spraying him with a garden hose to "wake him up." During the confrontation, George warns Max that his current trajectory will lead him to prison—a reality George witnessed firsthand while growing up—and emphasizes the sacrifices he made to provide Max with a better life. Shaken by the incident, George and Angie find themselves questioning their parenting and briefly contemplate a more drastic lifestyle change to protect Max's future. Meanwhile, Carmen and her friend Hayley discuss the new high school trend of wearing multi-coloured "jelly bracelets," where each color supposedly represents a different level of intimacy a girl has engaged in with a boy. Unaware of the urban legend and its suggestive meanings, Angie thinks the bracelets look cute and starts wearing a large stack of them herself. This leads to a mortifying encounter at the grocery store, where a teenage employee misinterprets Angie's bracelets and propositions her. A furious Angie returns home, confronts Carmen about the true meaning of the trend, and demands she throw them away.
63	7	"The Simple Life"	Gerry Cohen	Rick Nyholm	November 16, 2004	177808	8.73
When George is presented with a promising new job opportunity in a small Colorado town, he and Angie contemplate moving the family out of Los Angeles to escape the city's dangers and provide a safer environment for their children. To test the waters without causing immediate panic, they disguise the trip as a fun family ski vacation. However, once George is officially offered the position, the reality of uprooting their lives sets in. Angie initially resists the idea, deeply concerned about how Carmen and Max will react to leaving their home, which causes George to second-guess his own career ambitions. After taking the time to assess the peaceful, quiet surroundings of the town, Angie undergoes a change of heart. She changes her mind and agrees with George that the small town could truly be a safer, better place to raise their kids. Meanwhile, back at home in Los Angeles, Benny and Vic share an unexpected and highly awkward romantic kiss—a shocking moment that a completely horrified Ernie accidentally witnesses.
64	8	"Trouble in Paradise"	Gerry Cohen	Dave Caplan	November 23, 2004	177809	8.38
The family's dream of a safer, idyllic life quickly falls apart when Max and Carmen explore the local Colorado town. Max meets a manipulative local girl who pressures him into smoking, shoplifting, and making out. Simultaneously, Carmen meets a boy who coaxes her into drinking alcohol. During a disastrous family dinner, George and Angie are horrified to discover a heavily intoxicated Carmen and a hickey on Max's neck. Realizing that negative influences and troubled teenagers exist everywhere—and that a small town is not the perfect haven they imagined—George and Angie decide to pack up and head back home.Upon arriving back in Los Angeles, the comedic aftermath unfolds. As a highly unstable and visibly wobbly Carmen slowly tries to navigate her way upstairs to nurse her very first hangover, George repeatedly and aggressively slams the front door to maximize the noise. He punctuates each loud slam by mockingly yelling, "HAVE A NICE NAP!" right at her. Witnessing this chaotic moment, Angie has a definitive moment of clarity. She realizes that the geographic location does not matter; as parents, they simply have to work much harder to protect their kids from bad influences no matter where they live. Reassured that Los Angeles is where they belong, the family officially decides to stay.
65	9	"E. I., E. I.? Oh"	Joe Regalbuto	Danielle Sanchez-Witzel	November 30, 2004	177805	8.85
When Powers Aviation merges with another corporation, George mistakenly anticipates a promotion to Vice President, only to discover impending budget cuts targeting Benny and Ernie. He is assigned a corporate co-manager, Vanessa Brooks (Kimberly Williams-Paisley) a beautiful and cunning woman from a more white-collar background who George fears will take his job and whom George immediately recognizes as a threat despite Angie’s insistence that George possesses the "emotional intelligence" to handle her. While Vanessa relies strictly on analytics and numbers, George uses his background as a former line worker to lead as a people person. Vanessa manipulates George into presenting a sentimental workforce proposal to executives Jack and Mel, making him look incompetent. To bypass the ordered layoffs, George convinces the factory workers to collectively accept a pay cut, much to the dismay of Vanessa and the owners. However, George's unique reorganization strategy ultimately puts production 15 years ahead of schedule, impressing the executives prompting Jack to tell Vanessa she could learn something from George. Though George saves his factory team's jobs, he is forced to take a personal pay cut while Vanessa is promoted to Vice President.
66	10	"A Clear and Presentless Danger"	Victor Gonzalez	Dave Caplan	December 14, 2004	177811	11.19
Haunted by memories of Benny's historically lousy Christmas gifts, George decrees a one-gift-only policy for the family. He attempts to rig the "Secret Santa" drawing so Benny gets Angie's name instead of his, but the plan fails when Benny trades with Vic and ends up with Max. Convinced Benny will ruin Max's Christmas, George buys a paintball gun as a backup gift. In his rush to give Max the "better" present, George fails to notice the safety is off, and the gun accidentally fires, splattering paint all over Benny's gift. To George's shock, he discovers that Benny had actually come through with a thoughtful, high-quality present: a BMX bike and an autographed picture of Dave Mirra. Stricken with guilt, George tries to fix his mistake, leading to a surprise visit from the legendary BMX athlete himself
67	11	"Prescription for Trouble"	Gerry Cohen	Jim Hope	January 11, 2005	177812	9.14
When Carmen asks for birth control pills, George immediately assumes that her boyfriend Jason is pressuring her to have sex, but he denies it. George then realizes that it is Carmen who wants to have sex with Jason; he concludes its behavior inherited from Angie, when she wants to "celebrate" another success from work. When Max complains of a stomachache, he says he ate some stale mints in Carmen's room; George and Angie find out she bought birth control pills, with Benny and Vic's help. Max ends up being fine after some rest. In an effort to stop her, George and Angie bribe her with a car to postpone having sex until she is 18 (Although George jokes she needs to be 40).
68	12	"Friends Don't Let Friends Marry Drunks"	Gerry Cohen	Allen J. Zipper	January 18, 2005	177813	6.02
While taking Max and his friend Ricky out, George and Angie are stunned to discover that Ernie’s new girlfriend is Tammy (Gigi Rice), Ricky's alcoholic and neglectful birth mother. Ricky's alcoholic and neglectful birth mother. A major conflict erupts after George finds a positive pregnancy test and immediately warns Ernie against marrying her, fearing she is being unfaithful and manipulating him into marriage. Ernie, tired of being lonely, refuses to believe George’s warnings and delivers a harsh ultimatum: he tells George he knows Tammy has problems, but if George doesn't support him or agree to be his best man, then their friendship is over. The truth eventually emerges when Tammy admits the baby is not Ernie's. Despite this, Ernie's desperation for a family initially leads him to stay with her. However, the engagement ends shortly after; in a later episode, Ernie explains the final straw was learning that Tammy wanted to have sex with other guys while he was at work.
69	13	"George to the 3rd Power"	Andy Cadiff	George Lopez	January 25, 2005	177816	6.92
Unhappy with Max's aggressive company-approved dentist, Dr. Holland (Michael Clarke Duncan) George seeks to change the factory's dental plan. He goes behind Jack and Mel's backs to track down their estranged third brother and co-owner, Lou (Paul Gleason), leveraging their sibling rivalry to get the policy updated. However, George discovers Max fabricated his dental pain just to get his braces removed to impress a girl. To teach Max a lesson, George has Jack and Mel stage a fake firing. While the prank works, the owners punish George for his deception by imposing three conditions: Mel commands George to work weekends for five months after asking Max about soccer, Jack assigns George to the night shift after asking Max about family dinners, and George must personally apologize to Dr. Holland while getting a teeth cleaning.
70	14	"George Gets Assisterance"	Andy Cadiff	Danielle Sanchez-Witzel	February 1, 2005	177815	6.66
After a budget cut cancels the school's special education program, George and Angie attend a PTA meeting to confront the superintendent, Linda Lorenzo (Eva LaRue). During a heated clash, Linda dismissively asks why she should help George's son over all the other students, prompting George to reveal their secret connection by declaring, "Because he's your nephew, and I'm your brother. You're throwing out your brother!". Having recently discovered she was adopted and is actually Mexican, Linda meets with Benny and impresses her birth mother with her successful lifestyle. George bitterly notes that Linda's success is because she was "raised by people," while Benny dismisses George by calling him the "ugly sister." In an attempt to bond with her new family, Linda "helps" Max by altering his retake test to ensure he fails, thereby guaranteeing he remains eligible for the special education services he needs.
71	15	"Sabes Quake"	Bob Koherr	Michael Loftus	February 8, 2005	177810	6.05
When a 6.2 earthquake hits the Northridge area, George has the memory of the time he first experienced an earthquake as a child; at the time he thought his mother had brought home another "special uncle." Carmen is also traumatized, as the quake knocked a tree into her window. Both George and Carmen spend the next few days living in the yard (as the aftermath of the quake has left schools and businesses closed). After talking to Benny about his fears, George realizes that he needs to confront his fears, and so does Carmen. Managing to get back inside, George asks for some tequila to steady his nerves, while Carmen goes back to her room to face her fears.
72	16	"George Takes A Stroll Down Memory Pain"	Joe Regalbuto	David Grubstick	February 15, 2005	177814	6.34
When Benny demands money for a box of George's old childhood things, he discovers that his little league coach left him $10,000 in his will. However, because it was in Benny's name, she had found it before George and spent half of it on a new car and a trip to Vegas. When George confronts her for the remaining $5,000, Benny reveals that she gave it to Angie to start their lives; she had previously told George that the money came from selling a song from his band days to another country. A flashback reveals a heavily pregnant Angie agreed to take the money from Benny so she and George could live on their own. Benny upped her negativity to force George to be a man and defend Angie, and declare they would leave.
73	17	"George Buys a Vow"	Bob Koherr	Robert Borden	February 22, 2005	177818	8.47
George uses a fake wedding for his boss, Jack Powers, as a cover to finally renew his vows with Angie without her knowing. To keep the surprise, George tells Angie that Jack is marrying a woman named "Dell," but because Angie is the wedding planner, she begins to ask for too many personal details about the bride that George can't provide. To maintain the ruse, Jack "buys" a local woman named Dell (Jennifer Hasty) to pose as his fake fiancée for the rehearsal. On the day of the ceremony, George finally reveals the truth to a stunned Angie, and the two successfully renew their vows. Meanwhile, Benny and Vic shock the family by revealing they have begun a secret romantic relationship.
74	18	"George Watcha's Out for Jason"	Victor Gonzalez	Paul A. Kaplan & Mark Torgrove	March 1, 2005	177819	7.66
When Angie and George discover Carmen has been going to Jason's house unsupervised for the past month, they worry Carmen has broken her promise not to have sex before turning 18. They arrive just as Carmen is taking off Jason's sweater to do his laundry, easily mistaking the action for intimacy. Jason reveals that his parents are out of the country; they didn't abandon him, but left him behind so he could finish baseball season. Carmen later sneaks out to a party at Jason's, but kids from another school arrive with drugs and the police are called. The culprits refused to admit the drugs belonged to them, getting everyone arrested. George scolds Carmen, but not before he mistakenly assumes she's high. The police have to send Jason out of town, thus ruining his possible chance at a pro baseball career. Much to George's chagrin, he allows Jason to stay with the family - as long as he and Carmen can keep their hands off each other.
75	19	"George's Grand Slam"	Victor Gonzalez	Valentina Garza	March 8, 2005	177820	7.52
With Carmen and Jason grounded for throwing a party at Jason's and getting arrested (the latter of which wasn't their fault), neither is able to do much. But George does allow for some bending when it comes to Jason's baseball career which upsets Carmen and her feminist poet friend (Hilary Duff) who accuses George of being a sexist. When Carmen questions George about going to college, George makes a big mistake in telling Carmen she has no potential. In the end, George goes to the poetry slam, and Carmen's poem about him being a dreamkiller embarrasses him.
76	20	"George Needs Anchor Management"	Joe Regalbuto	Rick Nyholm	March 29, 2005	177817	6.51
When an old flame of Angie's, Spencer Vocal, moves back to town to become a news anchor, George becomes jealous of her giddy excitement over him. George's anxiety grows when he discovers Angie has not told him the full story of their past, as she initially claimed she was the one who dumped Spencer. Angie eventually reveals the truth: Spencer actually broke up with her, leading George to insecurely believe that Angie "dropped a level" to marry someone like him to ensure she would never be dumped again. The truth is revealed to be far more manipulative when Vic admits he bribed Spencer to break up with Angie years ago. Vic explains he wanted to teach his daughter that "looks didn't mean anything," and smugly remarks that when she chose George, "evidently the lesson sunk in." George takes the insult in stride, joking that he would gladly take a bribe to divorce Angie if the price were right.
77	21	"George's Relatively Bad Idea"	Joe Regalbuto	Stacey Pulwer	April 12, 2005	177822	5.59
George compromises his integrity by accepting a bribe from Vic in exchange for permission to date George’s long-lost sister, Linda Lorenzo (Eva LaRue). Tensions escalate when George witnesses the couple sharing a romantic kiss, leading to a confrontational family game of "Oh No! You Didn't?!" where the secret payment—which Vic used to pay off George's garage debt—is exposed The revelation is compounded by the awkward discovery that Vic and Benny once shared a French kiss years prior, a fact Vic struggles to explain to Linda. Ultimately, a disillusioned Linda decides to end the romance with Vic, telling him they should remain friends, while George is left to face the moral fallout of selling out his sister for "mad money". Despite the moral fallout, the family settles back into the game with teams of George/Angie, Vic/Ernie, and Benny/Linda. Benny leans into the dysfunction, mocking Vic and Ernie as the "two men Linda will never sleep with" and dubbing herself and Linda the "mother/daughter team that got tongued by the hairy Cuban."(Referring to Vic) As Linda casually asks, "Who's got the dice?"
78	22	"George's Extreme Makeover: Holmes Edition"	Victor Gonzalez	Spiro Skentzos	May 3, 2005	177821	5.65
When constant family distractions interfere with her wedding planning business, Angie demands George finish the garage office he started years ago. To save money, George ignores Angie's advice to hire professionals and instead recruits two shady friends from the old neighborhood, Victor (Ricardo Antonio Chavira and Bobby Danny Trejo) who quickly renovate the space in exchange for 10 cases of beer. Despite a nice aesthetic layout, the office is built without permits. When an inspector (Jim Belushi) arrives to assess the work, he condemns the structure as a "deathtrap," citing illegal wiring, poor plumbing, and a lack of support beams. He warns that the roof is so unstable that even "two birds landing on it" could cause it to collapse. To prove his faith in Angie's business after the fiasco, George surprises her by arranging a two-year lease for professional office space elsewhere.
79	23	"George Stare-oids Down Jason"	Joe Regalbuto	Michael Loftus	May 10, 2005	177823	5.47
One morning, George discovers Carmen and Jason sleeping together (though they only fell asleep together on Carmen's bed listening to music, not sex) George and Angie decide to kick Jason out. Jason's father (Stacy Keach) arrives for a dinner and George decide to slam him with the bill and then give him the bad news. While writing out the check he offers the two $10,000 to keep Jason until he goes to college. George decides to vote against the money and kick Jason out but, Jason and Carmen get into a heated argument and Jason goes ballistic and storms out of the house. While searching through Jason's bag he discovers that Jason is taking steroids. When Jason's father comes back to George's house George also discovers that Jason's own dad forced him onto steroids. Jason returns and George tells him if he tells his father that he won't take steroids, he can stay with them.
80	24	"George Negoti-ate It"	Joe Regalbuto	Luisa Leschin	May 17, 2005	177824	6.57
George steps in to act as the sports agent for Carmen’s boyfriend, Jason, when NFL Quarterbacks Donovan McNabb and Daunte Culpepper (guest starring as themselves) visit the house to recruit Jason for their respective alma maters. The situation turns disastrous when George accepts various illegal recruitment gifts from a college scout, unaware that as Jason's legal guardian, these "perks" violate NCAA rules and ruin Jason’s eligibility to play college football. Desperate to fix the mistake, George is forced to pivot and negotiate a professional baseball deal with a recruiter from the Washington Nationals. Meanwhile, the family gathers for George's birthday bash, where Angie surprises him with guitar lessons from Los Lobos guitarist Cesar Rosas. The celebration is upended when Carmen shows up with a diamond ring from Jason and announces they are moving to Georgia to get married. When George and Angie forbid it due to her age, Carmen stuns the party by claiming to be pregnant to manipulate them into giving their blessing. She eventually admits it was a lie designed to scare them, but the episode ends with the family's future in flux.

=== Season 5 (2005–06) ===
No. overall	No. in season	Title	Directed by	Written by	Original release date	Prod. code	U.S. viewers (millions)
81	1	"George Gets a Pain in the Ash"	Joe Regalbuto	Dave Caplan	October 5, 2005	2T7401RX	9.13
Carmen reveals she's not pregnant, only saying that to scare her parents into letting her marry Jason. Jason arrives late, giving George a new golf club as a gift; however, upon realizing Carmen blabbed, he quickly runs away. Jason flees after Carmen suggest actually having a baby, but she later finds out that her parents would give their blessing on marriage once she turned 18; however, when Carmen calls Jason to clear up the confusion, she doesn't mention this fact and only that they would marry in June. Though Jason has clearly broken up with her, Carmen is in denial, believing he will come back. Benny's house burns down, due to her tossing a cigarette into a garbage next to her drapes; this also burns up the money she had stuffed in her mattress. George and Angie take her into their home, much to George's chagrin.
82	2	"You Dropped a Mom on Me"	Joe Regalbuto	Dave Caplan	October 5, 2005	2T7402RX	9.13
Following the destruction of her home, George gets Benny an advance on her upcoming factory paychecks so she can secure an apartment. Instead of using the money for a security deposit, Benny foolishly gambles the entire advance away. Left with no options, she secretly moves into her car. Her situation worsens when one of her carelessly handled cigarettes accidentally sets the vehicle on fire, destroying her temporary shelter and her remaining possessions. Meanwhile, Ernie attempts to help by starting a workplace fundraiser to raise money for Benny. However, the effort fails when he only collects a petition filled with negative notes from her neighbors, who explicitly express their dislike for her and wish her the absolute worst. Concurrently, Carmen remains in heavy denial after her boyfriend, Jason, abruptly packs his things and flees. Despite his complete absence, she remains stubbornly determined to proceed with their marriage plans. Ultimately, realizing his mother's profound string of bad luck and complete lack of housing, George relents. He overcomes his initial resistance and officially allows Benny to move back into the Lopez family household
83	3	"George's Dog Days of Bummer"	Joe Regalbuto	Paul A. Kaplan & Mark Torgrove	October 12, 2005	2T7403	8.75
A deeply depressed Benny struggles to cope after losing all of her personal belongings in a sudden fire that destroyed her new apartment. Desperate to lift his mother's spirits, George searches for a solution and notices she has grown deeply attached to a stray dog named McCloud. However, a major conflict arises when a rowdy, intimidating biker (guest star Duane "Dog" Chapman) claims ownership of the animal and aggressively refuses to give up the stray dog (McCloud) that George's mom has grown to love. To intimidate the biker and reclaim the dog for Benny, George resorts to a desperate scheme: he begins publicly impersonating the Mayor of Los Angeles Mayor Antonio Villaraigosa using the politician's executive authority to pressure the biker. The ruse works temporarily, but word of the stunt quickly gets back to City Hall. Later that day, the real Mayor Villaraigosa makes a surprise appearance at the Lopez household to personally confront George, sternly warning him to immediately cease the impersonation or the city will completely halt his municipal trash pickup services. Unfazed by the threat, George attempts to negotiate, boldly asking the politician to establish a national holiday in his honor and erect a statue of him in Los Angeles. Villaraigosa firmly rejects the narcissistic request, delivering a grounded speech explaining that his actual mayoral goals are to improve the public school system and ensure neighborhoods are safe for every family across Los Angeles. Chastised, George agrees to stop the impersonation, having successfully secured the dog to help comfort his mother.
84	4	"George Drives the Batmobile"	Bob Koherr	Allen J. Zipper	October 19, 2005	2T7405	7.94
Following Benny's housing displacement, George and Angie refuse her persistent demands to buy her a new vehicle. To keep her out of trouble, they reluctantly agree to drive her around town. However, Benny completely takes advantage of the arrangement. She bribes Carmen to drop her off at a bar and later forces Angie to drive her and a romantic guest around town. Angie abruptly quits the chauffeur arrangement after Benny and her date blatantly invite her to join in on their backseat make-out session. The driving duties fall solely on George, who is tasked with transporting Benny and ten of her rowdy senior friends. Hoping to appease them, George takes the group to Circus Burger. The outing turns chaotic when the elderly passengers repeatedly scream and shout inside the vehicle every time George begs them for quiet. Distracted and stressed, George stops at a red light next to a young street racer who baits him into a drag race. George impulsively accepts the challenge, leading to a swift encounter and trouble with local law enforcement
85	5	"Trick or Treat Me Right"	Bob Koherr	Jim Hope	October 26, 2005	2T7406	8.50
As Halloween approaches, George and Angie engage in an escalating war of elaborate practical jokes that are funnier and scarier than ever. However, the lighthearted holiday mood turns sour due to Benny's presence in the house. Living under George's roof has only intensified Benny's toxicity, and her abusive comments and mean-spirited behavior toward George grow progressively worse. While George usually shrugs off her insults, her relentless cruelty pushes him to his emotional limit, making it impossible for him to laugh things off. Fed up with being bullied and belittled in his own home, George finally reaches a breaking point and fiercely steps up to his mother. He confronts Benny directly, telling her he is completely tired of her abusive commentary and demands immediate changes to the way she treats him. Meanwhile, the episode features a secondary storyline involving Ernie, who achieves a personal milestone by finally moving into his own apartment.
86	6	"George Takes a Sentimental Ernie"	Victor Gonzalez	Rick Nyholm	November 2, 2005	2T7407	7.34
Still furious over Benny's toxic behaviour, George stubbornly refuses to return to his own home until his mother moves out. He decides to temporarily crash at Ernie's place, which Ernie still shares with his parents. However, George quickly experiences firsthand the smothering and difficult environment of the household. Recognizing that Ernie faces a similar tension living under his parents' thumb, George convinces a reluctant Ernie that it is finally time to pack up and get his own apartment. To make the transition possible, George agrees to move in as Ernie's official roommate. Ernie is on cloud 9 over his newfound freedom and independent space. However, the arrangement is short-lived. Back at the Lopez house, an escalating issue regarding Max's well-being forces George to reassess his priorities, prompting him to finally abandon the bachelor pad and move back home to his family.
87	7	"George Finds Therapy Benny-ficial"	Victor Gonzalez	John R. Morey	November 9, 2005	2T7408	7.92
Following a traumatic shooting incident at Max's school, George and Angie become deeply concerned for his mental health. George takes Max to see the school guidance counselor, Dr. Phillip Nickleson (Richard Lewis), to help him process the potential stress. However, Dr. Nickleson quickly uncovers that Max is entirely unfazed by the actual shooting. Max reveals that his regular exposure to "Car Jacker 3"—a violent video game parody of Grand Theft Auto—has completely desensitized him to firearms. Instead, the counselor uncovers that Max's underlying emotional trauma stems entirely from George's recent absence from the household. George had been staying at Ernie's apartment to avoid his mother, Benny, who recently moved back into the Lopez home. Realizing his family dynamic is hurting his son, George recognizes that he must finally settle his ongoing dispute with his mother. The planned appointment unexpectedly evolves into an impromptu, seven-hour therapy session for George himself. He ends up venting decades of built-up frustration regarding the emotional and psychological abuse he suffered at the hands of Benny during his childhood. Dr. Nickleson relates to the trauma, noting he shares a similarly stressful relationship with his own mother. Following a serious conversation based on his breakthroughs, Benny finally realizes that her presence is causing severe friction in the household. She decides to move out and informs the family that she will be moving into her friend Gina's apartment. In her signature style, Benny hurls parting insults at the family as her unique way of saying goodbye, claiming they all drove her crazy. Crucially, she spares George from her usual vitriol and genuinely thanks him for helping her get back on her feet—a rare moment of appreciation that leaves George incredibly happy. In the episode's epilogue, George decides to get petty revenge on Angie for consistently taking Benny's side during their living arrangement disputes. He secretly instructs Dr. Nickleson to trick Angie into believing she suffers from a fictional psychological condition called "Know-it-all syndrome." Thoroughly annoyed by Angie's constant, overbearing interjections throughout the day, the counselor happily agrees to play along with the prank.
88	8	"George Tries to Write a Wrong"	Bob Koherr	Michael Loftus	November 16, 2005	2T7404	8.13
As George and Angie prepare to celebrate their wedding anniversary, George uncovers a series of secrets that were better left unrevealed when he sneaks a peek at a ten-year-old unopened letter written by Angie. Through the letter and a subsequent confrontation, George discovers that her wealthy father, Vic, had opened a secret bank account containing $20,000 for Angie when she married George, intending for her to use it if she ever decided to dump him. George becomes furious upon discovering that Angie never closed the account. A flashback reveals that she actually withdrew the money in 1993 and temporarily left him with the children. This occurred right after George mentioned that Benny might have to move into their home to help cover their bills. Desperate to deflect George's anger, Angie attempts to seductively distract him. However, the distraction backfires when she realizes that George altered his own anniversary letter to cover up his own past misdeeds. The table turns, prompting George to clumsily attempt to seduce her to avoid further scrutiny. The tension finally diffuses when it is revealed that the secret account is completely empty anyway. Vic confesses that he spent all the emergency money he had set aside for Angie on a spectacular business failure: a botched investment attempting to popularize Cuban fast food in America. With the conflict resolved, George wraps up the ordeal by relentlessly poking fun at Vic's terrible business idea.
89	9	"George Discovers Benny's Sili-Con Job"	George Lopez	Luisa Leschin	November 30, 2005	2T7409	7.93
George faces backlash at Powers Aviation when he allocates a meager twenty-dollar budget for Benny's workplace celebration. Insulted, Benny retaliates by stealing a birthday present meant for George and gifting it to Angie instead. In response, George escalates the feud by mercilessly mocking Benny's advanced age during a company meeting, going so far as to stage a humiliating display using oversized fake breasts to mock her physique (funny) display with fake breasts in front of everyone at work. Feeling deeply self-conscious and eager to prove she still looks young, Benny announces her intention to undergo breast implants surgery, much to George's absolute horror. Shortly after, Benny appears with a drastically altered, top-heavy silhouette to make herself look younger, much to George's dismay. "...The reveal triggers a mix of shock and discomfort among the family, highlighted by Angie's father, Vic Palmero , who walks into the room with a bottle of wine, freezes in horror, and screams, "¡Ay Dios mío! ¡Tú tienes bombas atómicas!!!" before frantically attempting to backtrack by complimenting her hair instead. Shortly after the initial shock, Vic shifts his demeanor, admitting he is examining her chest from a "doctor's perspective." When Benny asks what the good doctor thinks, Vic boldly declares them "yummy." A scandalized Angie reprimands him, prompting Vic to defiantly reply that he is older now, says what he likes, and he likes what he sees. However, the situation is ultimately revealed to be an elaborate ruse..." However it turns out Benny just put rubber items from the surgeon into her bra and has bought her own apartment, leaving George with a bad Botox operation.Shortly after, Benny appears with a drastically altered, top-heavy silhouette, convincing George that she went through with the operation. However, the situation is revealed to be an elaborate ruse. Benny never actually had the surgery; she merely stuffed her brassiere with medical-grade rubber sizing inserts borrowed from the plastic surgeon's office. Benny reveals that she used the savings George assumed went toward cosmetic surgery to officially purchase her own apartment. The episode concludes with a final twist as George's own attempt at a cosmetic enhancement backfires, leaving him to suffer the physical discomfort and frozen expressions of a completely botched Botox injection
90	10	"George Says I Do... More in This Marriage"	Joe Regalbuto	Kathy Fischer	December 7, 2005	2T7410	8.08
While providing marriage counseling to a young engaged couple from their church, George and Angie spark an intense disagreement regarding who works harder within their own marriage. To definitively settle the argument, they establish a highly competitive household point system, assigning numerical values to everyday chores and parental tasks. As the competition progresses, George establishes a clear lead and is on the verge of winning the bet. However, George's father-in-law, Vic Palmero, intervenes and pulls George aside. Vic warns him that completely bruising Angie's pride could severely damage their relationship, convincing George that letting Angie win is the only way to safeguard his marriage. When it comes time to tally the final scores, Angie confidently declares she has reached 90 points. Adhering to Vic's advice, George intentionally underreports his own superior score, lying that he also has exactly 90 points to force a peaceful tie. The plan immediately backfires when Angie smugly reveals she was bluffing and actually possesses 120 points. Realizing he was completely played, George snaps; discarding any further concern for marital harmony, he furiously reveals his real score to prove he was the true winner. Because George has a well-known history of lying, Angie refuses to believe his true numbers, declaring him the loser. As punishment for losing the bet, George is forced to take on all of Angie's domestic chores for an entire month. The episode concludes with a comedic, stylized sequence a month later, showing that the grueling swap has caused a complete psychological role reversal, with George adopting Angie's stressed, micromanaging habits while a relaxed Angie begins acting exactly like George.
91	11	"George is Being Elfish and Christ-misses His Family"	Joe Regalbuto	Paul A. Kaplan & Mark Torgrove	December 14, 2005	2T7411	7.16
George ends up spending Christmas all by himself after he gets caught telling a lie in order to get out of spending the holidays with Angie's family. He originally fabricated the deception to avoid dealing with the annual stress of his in-laws, intending to enjoy a quiet, relaxing holiday break alone in the house.While home alone, George experiences a bizarre, vivid television-style vision featuring his family in a surreal Christmas special. In this hallucination, his father-in-law Vic appears as Santa Claus, while his mother Benny is dressed up as a penguin. The rest of his family members fill out various strange holiday character roles, acting out a dysfunctional Christmas production inside his mind.The strange dream sequence forces George to confront his own isolation and the reality of his choices. He quickly realizes the true value of being surrounded by his loved ones, despite the chaos and frustration that holiday gatherings usually bring. Deeply regretting his deceitful behavior, George is left entirely alone on Christmas Day, desperately missing his family and wishing he could undo his lie to be with them.
92	12	"George Enrolls Like That"	Joe Regalbuto	Rick Nyholm	January 25, 2006	2T7413	6.31
Angie tricks George into attending a mandatory assembly at Max's school, which George initially believes is a standard parent-teacher meeting. Upon arrival, he discovers that the assembly is specifically designed for parents who did not graduate from college, organized under the belief that these parents need extra encouragement to ensure their children do not repeat the same cycle. Offended by the implication that non-college-educated parents are inferior, George vocally resists the school's messaging. He boasts that he has built a highly successful career as a factory manager without ever needing a degree, arguing that higher education is a waste of time and money. George's anti-college stance backfires when Max skips a major test at school and uses his father's logic to declare that he has decided not to go to college either. Realizing that his rhetoric has set a poor academic example for his son, George proposes a compromise to motivate him. He and Max strike a deal: if George enrolls in college and passes a course, Max must commit to finishing his schoolwork and pursuing higher education. George subsequently registers for a rigorous microeconomics class at a local community college. Once classes begin, George immediately finds himself overwhelmed by the complex material. To mask his severe academic struggles and lack of understanding, he adopts a persona as the class clown, frequently interrupting lectures with jokes to distract his classmates and disrupt the lessons. His behavior quickly draws the ire of his professor, Tracy Lim (Ming-Na Wen), who easily sees through his comedic defense mechanism. Recognizing that George is falling behind, Professor Lim pulls him aside to offer academic assistance and help him understand the material. Unwilling to admit his vulnerability, George stubbornly declines her help, leaving his academic future and his deal with Max in serious jeopardy.
93	13	"George Keeps Truant to Himself"	Bob Koherr	John R. Morey	February 1, 2006	2T7414	5.83
As the microeconomics coursework becomes increasingly overwhelming, George reaches his breaking point and decides to quietly drop out of his community college class. Desperate to keep his failure a secret from Angie and the kids, he goes to elaborate lengths to maintain the illusion that he is still enrolled. When he needs an emergency excuse to explain his sudden absence from campus to his professor, Tracy Lim, George concocts a massive lie. He tells Professor Lim that he has decided to leave school because he is joining the Army to serve his country. To gain her sympathy, he mirrors her own life story, as her husband was a soldier who was tragically killed in battle. George's elaborate web of lies collapses when a compassionate Professor Lim makes an unexpected and unwelcome visit to the Lopez household. Moved by George's supposed military sacrifice, she arrives bearing home-cooked food and comforting words to help support Angie through George's upcoming deployment. A completely bewildered Angie demands answers, forcing George to confess the entire truth on the spot. Horrified and deeply hurt by the fact that George exploited her personal tragedy and her husband's death just to cover up dropping a class, a furious Professor Lim storms out of the house. Meanwhile, Max accidentally overhears the entire confrontation and discovers that his father broke their academic pact by dropping out of school. Feeling betrayed, Max believes he is no longer obligated to hold up his end of the deal to pursue higher education. George sits Max down for a heartfelt, honest conversation to salvage the situation. George explains that his own childhood was entirely devoid of encouragement, noting that he never had anyone in his life who expressed pride in his achievements. He expresses how deeply proud he is of Max's recent academic success and hard work. Touched by his father's vulnerability and genuine pride, Max changes his mind and agrees to stay on track for college, repairing their relationship.
94	14	"The Kidney Stays in the Picture"	Joe Regalbuto	Jim Hope	February 8, 2006	2T7412	6.40
Max gets his very first girlfriend, a classmate named Christie (Ashly Holloway), and the two begin spending their free time making out on the backyard hammock. While Angie grows concerned that the young couple is moving too fast after overhearing them trade "I love yous," George initially dismisses it as harmless puppy love. However, the household dynamic shifts when Max suddenly starts frequently wetting the bed. Discovering the accidents, Vic leaps to a wild conclusion based on his own youth, assuming that Max must be sexually active with Christie and that the physical stress is causing his bladder issues. Concerned by Vic's theories and Max's persistent accidents, George and Angie take Max to the doctor for a proper medical evaluation. The trip reveals a far more serious reality: Max's bed-wetting is a symptom of an underlying medical condition. The doctor explains that the tubes leading to Max's kidneys are abnormally narrow, causing urine to back up and infect his kidney. To prevent life-threatening organ failure and future disease, the physician informs the family that Max must undergo immediate surgery to have the damaged kidney removed. The diagnosis sends George into a state of profound despair and guilt. He painfully recalls that his estranged father, Manny, suffered from severe kidney problems—a crisis that previously disrupted the family during a past Thanksgiving. Recognizing the genetic link, George becomes consumed by the agonizing belief that he passed down his family's defective genes to his own son. As George struggles to cope with his guilt, the family must pull together to support Max through his upcoming major surgery.
95	15	"A Funeral Brings George to His Niece"	Bob Koherr	Luisa Leschin	February 15, 2006	2T7415	6.16
Following a family funeral, George is stunned to learn his sister-in-law, Claudia, named him the sole trustee of his niece Veronica’s(Aimee Garcia) multi-million dollar inheritance. Determining that the spoiled Veronica needs discipline, George grants her only a meager weekly allowance, prompting a defiant rebellion. Veronica enlists Max to help her shoplift and eventually returns to the Lopez home under the influence of marijuana after quitting her mall job. In a moment of rare vulnerability, Vic admits he "ruined" his own children by over-indulging them and confesses that George is the "better father"—a statement George pettily records as a new ringtone. Reminiscing about the "good kid" Veronica once was, Vic begs George to save his granddaughter from a similar path of entitlement. Empowered by Vic's plea, George stands his ground when a high and arrogant Veronica demands her money; he instead asserts his authority as a surrogate father, forcing her to adhere to his household rules and enroll in college to secure her future.
96	16	"George Gets Caught in a Powers Play"	Bob Koherr	Kathy Fischer	February 22, 2006	2T7416	5.90
Determined to teach his spoiled niece, Veronica (Aimee Garcia), the value of hard work and the meaning of a dollar, George refuses to let her tap into her multi-million dollar inheritance. Instead, he decides to force her to earn her keep by hiring her for a entry-level position down on the factory floor at Powers Brothers Aviation. However, George's plan immediately backfires due to Veronica's physical attractiveness. Her presence completely distracts the male factory workers, particularly George's best friend, Ernie. Smitten by her beauty, Ernie eagerly volunteers to do all of Veronica's physical labor for her, allowing her to coast through her shifts completely work-free until a frustrated George steps in and puts a definitive stop to the special treatment. Meanwhile, the factory dynamic grows increasingly complicated when George's eccentric, wealthy co-boss, Mel Powers, also falls hard for the much younger Veronica. Ignoring the massive corporate boundary issues, Mel pursues her, and the two quickly plan a romantic rendezvous with intentions to make out and hook up in a high-end hotel room. George is left scrambling to manage his workplace while keeping a strict eye on his niece's questionable social choices. Ultimately, the short-lived workplace romance abruptly collapses due to Veronica's fickle ambitions. Despite her initial irresponsibility, Veronica applies to college and easily secures her enrollment. Realizing that her academic endeavors are far more stimulating than her time at the aviation plant, she quickly grows bored of Mel and his over-eager advances. Viewing him as a temporary distraction, Veronica unceremoniously dumps Mel to focus on her transition to college, leaving a disgruntled Mel behind at the factory while George breathes a sigh of relief.
97	17	"George Doesn't Trustee Angie's Brother"	Sheldon Epps	Paul A. Kaplan & Mark Torgrove	March 1, 2006	2T7417	5.40
Angie’s estranged brother, Ray(Andy García), arrives with the sudden promise of repaying long-standing debts to George and Vic. Vic remains deeply bitter over Ray's lifelong history of manipulation and abandonment, memorably confronting him by declaring that whenever Ray appears, he leaves a "trail of slime" behind. When Ray claims he acquired his sudden repayment money through "investing," George also becomes deeply skeptical. While Angie is hopeful for a reconciliation, George remains skeptical and soon discovers Ray is attempting to manipulate Veronica into "investing" her inheritance into a fraudulent business venture. "...While a hopeful Angie embraces his return, George remains deeply skeptical of Ray's sudden financial turnaround. When Ray pays back long-standing family debts and claims he acquired the money through 'investing,' George's suspicions are confirmed. He discovers Ray is actually broke and attempting to emotionally manipulate his daughter, Veronica, into 'investing' her newly acquired family inheritance into a fraudulent business venture. "...To thwart the scheme, George plays along and provides Ray with a fake business check signed with the alias 'Carlos Santana.' George also secretly rigs Ray's suitcase with firecrackers and a clock. When George catches Ray attempting to flee the house in the dead of night, Ray breaks down and confesses, 'Look George, I owe money to people you don't want to owe money to.' Unmoved by the excuse, George coldly orders Ray to leave the premises by morning...". Following Ray's departure, George's suspicions are confirmed when he discovers Ray is broke and attempting to emotionally manipulate his daughter, Veronica, into "investing" her newly acquired family inheritance into a fraudulent venture. When Ray tries to mask his sudden departure by lying about an early business meeting, an enraged Angie corners him. Revealing that George told her everything, she aggressively grabs Ray by his necktie to choke him and call out his deceit. George reveals the truth to a devastated Veronica. A heartbroken Veronica exclaims, "I cannot believe that I fell for this again. What's wrong with me?" as she realizes Ray used the same manipulation tactics he employed when he stole her quinceañera money years prior. Recognizing her emotional growth and the pain of Ray’s betrayal, George rewards her maturity by releasing a portion of her inheritance to cover her upcoming college tuition.
98	18	"George Helps Ernie See the Cellu-Light"	Sheldon Epps	Dave Caplan	March 15, 2006	2T7418	6.71
After factory owner Mel Powers threatens to fire Ernie for his weight, the Lopez family intervenes with differing philosophies. Vic provides "brutal honesty," bluntly informing Ernie during a punching bag workout in the yard that he is "mortally obese" and destined to end up exactly like his mother if he doesn't change. Meanwhile, Angie provides the psychological perspective, suggesting to George that Ernie’s weight isn't just about food, but a subconscious defense mechanism to deal with a lifetime of romantic rejection. The conflict reaches a climax when George takes Ernie to a clothing store. In a high-stakes "wake-up call," George tricks Ernie into trying on a pair of pants that Ernie finds comfortable, only to reveal they are actually his mother’s size-50 "church pants." Seeing himself in his mother's clothes in the mirror shatters Ernie’s denial. George uses the moment to explain the theory he and Angie discussed: Ernie has been gaining weight to reject women first. By making himself undesirable, he stays in control of the rejection and prevents anyone from getting close enough to hurt him. Empowered by this realization, Ernie successfully loses 17 pounds and gains the confidence to ask out his co-worker, Nancy, who accepts.
99	19	"George Gets Cross Over Freddie"	Katy Garretson	Stacey Pulwer	March 22, 2006	2T7421	7.24
In a crossover episode with Freddie, George and Angie become deeply concerned when they discover that Max has initiated an online romance with a teenage girl named Zoey (Chloe Suazo) from Chicago. Fearing his son is being targeted by an internet child predator, George intercepts the communications and assumes Max's digital identity to lure the suspect into a sting operation. Unbeknownst to George, Zoey's protective uncle, chef Freddie Moreno(Freddie Prinze Jr.) has harbored the exact same suspicions about Max's profile and has assumed his niece's identity online to protect her. The digital standoff culminates in an offline confrontation when Freddie and his best friend and business partner, Chris (Brian Austin Green) take a business trip to Los Angeles. take a business trip to Los Angeles to confront the suspected predator face to face. Accompanied by Ernie Cardenas—who awkwardly attempts to forge a friendship with Chris—George meets the Chicago duo. Following an intense, comedy-fueled misunderstanding, the men eventually cross-reference their stories and realize that Max and Zoey are indeed real teenagers who were genuinely chatting with each other. With the predator fears debunked, the families put aside their differences, and George and Freddie form a mutual respect as protective parental figures.
100	20	"George Vows to Make Some Matri-Money"	Katy Garretson	George Lopez	March 29, 2006	2T7419	6.63
In an effort to prove he can manage Angie's event-planning career more efficiently than she can, George boldly takes over the wedding coordination for Brooke (special guest star Eva Longoria) one of Angie’s exceptionally wealthy and high-maintenance clients. George quickly realizes he is in over his head when Brooke's severe perfectionism exposes a highly erratic, demanding personality. Driven by extreme superstitions fueled by her family's long, continuous history of bitter divorces, Brooke becomes completely neurotic about her own upcoming nuptials. Frustrated by her relentless micro-management, George quips that God gave the bride all of her physical beauty just to cover up her underlying craziness by saying: "God gave [the bride] all that pretty to cover up all [her] crazy" as she is constantly stressing over the details and constantly makes minute changes such as the writing on the invitations. It gets stranger to the point where George needs to get a scarecrow fitted for a tux. Observing her panic, George and Angie reflect on their own marriage, discussing how they have successfully stayed together for 19 years through basic principles of love, laughter, and listening. Meanwhile, George struggles under the intense weight of the planning, discovering that the job is far more difficult than he anticipated. The chaos escalates as Brooke demands constant, minute changes to the invitations and eventually requires George to get a literal farm scarecrow custom-fitted for a tuxedo. Adding to the domestic distractions, George's father-in-law, Vic Palmero, eagerly attends the festivities solely to flirt with the bridesmaids. Just before the ceremony, George delivers a grounding speech to Brooke, telling her to focus on the love she shares with her fiancé, Anthony, and to make him the luckiest man alive as she walks down the aisle. Though the ceremony initially proceeds beautifully, the wedding completely blows up when a sudden, torrential rainstorm disrupts the outdoor venue. As the guests and a panicked George quickly flee the scene, a soaked Brooke is left behind screaming in isolation that the weather has ruined her special day. Despite the environmental disaster, George still receives his final payment for coordinating the event. The episode concludes with a furious Angie discovering that George wasted all of his hard-earned wedding profit to commission a massive, narcissistic, framed portrait of himself dressed in a smoking jacket with a cigar in hand. To Angie's horror, George boasts that the painting is part of a "1 of 10" multi-print set, revealing he hung identical portraits all over the house, including directly above their master bed. Note: This episodes ends with George spending his commission on a picture of him holding a cigar that appears in "George Nieces a New Media Room".
101	21	"George Discovers How Mescal-ed Up His Life Would Have Been Without the Benny-Fits"	Joe Regalbuto	Valentina Garza	April 5, 2006	2T7420	6.07
Benny becomes furious when she discovers that George has rigged the results of a factory productivity contest in favor of her workspace rival, Gina. In retaliation, Benny destroys George's favorite golf club. Discovering the damage, a devastated George kneels on the floor, cradling the broken club while crying out, "¡Ay Dios mío! Why, why? She should have taken the kids! We had so much in common... your oversized head... I was supposed to go first!" Angie enters the room just as George reviews a threatening ransom-style note left by Benny, which warns that for every day she does not receive a compensatory trip to Reno, one of George's loved ones will die. When George confronts his mother, an argument erupts over the contest; George justifies his actions by bringing up the childhood promises Benny broke, and exposes that she has been cheating on her factory timecard for years. Despite the revelations, Angie sides entirely with Benny, leaving George feeling isolated. Frustrated, George retreats to Thirsty's bar, where he vents to Ernie. Ernie attempts to console him by stating, "George, you may have had a rough childhood, but you manage the plant, and you married Angie." When George points out that Ernie has already repeated that exact phrase three times, Ernie emphasizes that George needs to look at the bigger picture of what he has achieved. Still miserable, George ignores Ernie's warnings and consumes a bottle of tequila, accidentally swallowing the embedded (with the worm) and hallucinates him living Ernie's life, while Ernie is living his life. The insect triggers a surreal hallucination where George lives Ernie's life as a low-level factory worker, while Ernie lives George's life as the plant manager married to Angie. Within the dream, George observes a loving, overly supportive alternate version of Benny. He quickly realizes that without his real mother's harsh, unfiltered tough love, he would have grown up without the thick skin and resilience required to win over Angie or earn a promotion to management at Powers Aviation. The vision grows increasingly bizarre, culminating in George witnessing Ernie kissing Angie, and a hallucinated Vic appearing dressed up as a giant tequila worm. Terrified, George abruptly wakes up in the bar. Shaken by the nightmare, George tells Ernie about the dream swap, including the unsettling detail that Ernie had his managerial job and was married to Angie. Intrigued by the concept of being married to Angie, a highly motivated Ernie immediately turns to Tanya the bartender and demands, "Hey, give me every freakin' worm you got!" George rushes home and passionately kisses Angie, aggressively boasting that he kisses much better than Ernie. A confused Angie casually downplays the comparison, telling George that it happened once at a Christmas party a few years prior when she and Ernie ended up under the mistletoe, instructing him to finally let it go. Having developed a newfound appreciation for his upbringing, George calls Benny over and gives her the trip to Reno she wanted. True to form, Benny insults him by calling him a wuss for giving in. However, George gets the ultimate last laugh; he retaliates by secretly removing the steering wheel from Benny's car, declaring that she still owes him a replacement golf club. When a stranded Benny furiously asks how she is supposed to go buy him a club without her steering wheel, George smugly replies, "Not my problem," and walks away. The episode concludes with an end-credits tag scene where Tanya the bartender calls George back to the bar. A heavily intoxicated Ernie has consumed multiple tequila worms and is slow-dancing with Vic, who happens to be wearing a promotional giant worm costume. As they dance, Vic tells him, "You'll have to tip me, Ernie, I have no arms." George arrives and shines a flashlight to guide them out, prompting a highly excited Ernie to happily follow the light out of the establishment.
102	22	"It's a Cliffhanger, By George"	Joe Regalbuto	Robert Borden	April 12, 2006	2T7422	6.81
Everything hangs in the balance for the entire Lopez family: Ernie tells George that the factory is moving to Mexico and they will both be jobless; after Benny reunites with her ex, Ernie tells George that Benny's ex robbed a convenience store and calls the cops, though it is for a past crime Benny committed; Angie has been feeling sick for a few days and awaits the results of a home pregnancy test; Carmen is afraid to open her final college letter after being rejected by Northwestern, Iowa, and Columbia; Max has swiped a forbidden beer and is about to sample his first alcohol; and Vic prepares to propose marriage to a 27-year-old woman he barely knows.

=== Season 6 (2007) ===
No. overall	No. in season	Title	Directed by	Written by	Original release date	Prod. code	U.S. viewers (millions)
103	1	"George's Mom Faces Hard Tambien"	Joe Regalbuto	Dave Caplan	January 24, 2007	3T5201	6.08
The sixth-season premiere focuses on major transitions within the Lopez household as Carmen prepares to depart for college in Vermont, marking the character's final physical appearance in the series. Just as George and Angie brace themselves to become empty nesters, Angie discovers that she might be pregnant. While George’s employment status at Powers Aviation stabilizes, the family faces an array of domestic crises: Max suffers from a severe hangover after experimenting with alcohol, and Vic complicates family dynamics by contemplating an engagement to a 27-year-old woman named Lindsay Cafferty. Concurrently, Benny faces immediate jail time after being arrested as a suspected accomplice in a bank robbery committed 30 years prior by an old flame, Eddie Carter. Despite real-world legal conventions regarding the statute of limitations, the narrative establishes that Benny must stand trial. Amidst the chaos, Angie receives confirmation from her physician that her pregnancy test was actually a false positive. However, witnessing George's severe emotional distress and vulnerability over Carmen leaving home, Angie chooses to temporarily withhold the medical truth from her husband to spare his feelings.
104	2	"George's House Has Two Empty Wombs"	Joe Regalbuto	Paul A. Kaplan & Mark Torgrove	January 31, 2007	3T5202	7.71
As Carmen prepares to leave for college, George struggles with the impending "empty nest," leading Angie to continue a fabrication that she is pregnant to ease his emotional pain. Although she discovers a pregnancy test was a false positive, Angie maintains the lie to keep George from spiralling into depression over Carmen's absence. Simultaneously, Vic introduces the family to his new 27-year-old fiancée, Lindsay Cafferty (Stacy Keibler), George and Angie immediately become suspicious of the massive age gap and Lindsay's superficial behavior. Their suspicions are confirmed as it becomes clear Lindsay is a "gold-digger" who is only interested in Vic for his wealth, frequently manipulating him into buying her expensive gifts. The episode contrasts Angie’s well-intentioned lie with Lindsay’s predatory deception.
105	3	"George Nieces a New Media Room"	Joe Regalbuto	Jim Hope	February 7, 2007	3T5203	7.03
George has just finished remodeling Carmen's room into a new entertainment room, watching Clint Eastwood movies with surround sound, but Veronica returns, announcing her trust fund has been frozen by a relative (who is after the money), threatening her with bankruptcy. Angie forces George to allow Veronica to stay in the new room while she attends college (instead of the guest room), and Veronica brings her new boyfriend Mike, her college professor who has a trust issue with his wife. After she dumps him, Mike begins to stalk Veronica, which ends with George punching him in the face, getting the professor arrested and George's TV being destroyed. After that, the cops told Veronica she can put a restraining order against Mike, but George forces her to give up her diamond bracelet because of the TV being destroyed.
106	4	"George Testi-Lies for Benny"	Bob Koherr	Rick Nyholm	February 14, 2007	3T5204	7.13
Benny stands trial for her past criminal actions regarding the 30-year-old bank robbery, but the prosecution's case takes a dramatic turn when her estranged mother, Luisa Diaz(Rita Moreno),testifies against her. During the trial, a long-buried family secret is revealed: George was originally put up for adoption at birth, just like his sister Linda. However, unlike Linda, George's adoptive family returned him to Benny shortly after the placement. Devastated by the revelation, George takes the witness stand. His emotional testimony detailing his turbulent upbringing and the profound psychological weight of his mother's lifelong secrets deeply influences the court's final decision. Ultimately, Benny avoids a prison sentence but is sentenced to complete 500 hours of community service. The legal saga concludes on a fragile, unresolved note as Benny and Luisa remain bitterly estranged despite the courtroom resolution. Guest star: Adam West as Benny's lawyer.
107	5	"Sabes Gay, It's George's Fantasy Episode"	George Lopez	George Lopez	February 21, 2007	3T5209	5.83
Following a severe humiliation at work and an ensuing argument with Angie, George retreats to the local bar, Thirsty's, to commiserate with Ernie. While consuming a bottle of tequila, George inadvertently ingests the embedded (with the worm), which triggers a vivid, surreal hallucination. In this dream reality, George envisions himself and Ernie as deeply in love, openly gay sweethearts who are actively preparing to unite as life partners. "...The vivid hallucination functions as a subconscious reflection of George's real-world stress, which was triggered after the Power Brothers publicly humiliated him at work over a botched factory order—an incident that caused him to forget a date with Angie and subsequently refuse to communicate with her. Within the dream, George’s father-in-law Vic appears as a priest and Angie acts as the chaotic wedding planner. Upon realizing his true feelings and waking up, George tells Ernie that communicating with your wife is not a bad thing, prompting him to return home and reconcile with Angie." Concurrently, back in reality, Ernie suffers a crushing romantic rejection when his blind date, Helen, abruptly walks out on him immediately upon meeting. Disheartened by a lifelong history of romantic failure, Ernie declares that he has completely given up on finding a meaningful lifelong partner, concluding that meaningless one-night stands are a preferable alternative. He maintains this stance despite actively resisting the advances of an attracted waitress. Moments later, the female bartender attempts to seduce Ernie into a casual encounter; however, Ernie remains entirely oblivious to her overtures and exits the establishment alone, leaving George to process the lingering emotional weight of his hallucination.
108	6	"George Thinks Vic's Fiancée Is Lion about Being a Cheetah"	Bob Koherr	Luisa Leschin	February 28, 2007	3T5206	6.04
After George accidentally influences Vic to tear up his pre-nuptial agreement, he becomes convinced that Vic’s much younger fiancée, Lindsay is a "gold digger" who is being unfaithful. Desperate to protect Vic’s assets but lacking proof, George and Ernie concoct a scheme to enlist the help of the reality CheatersTo get the show's production crew involved, George deceives the host (Joey Greco), guest stars as himself, into believing that George is the one whose partner is cheating. The plan goes awry when the Cheaters camera crew surprises George at home while his wife, Angie, is returning from the mall. To cover up the ruse, George frantically introduces Angie to Greco as his sister, creating a bizarre misunderstanding where Greco questions why George’s "fiancée" is kissing his father. Despite the domestic chaos and an unexpected appearance by Benny—who tries to dodge the cameras due to her own past history with the reality show—Greco ultimately uncovers real surveillance footage of Lindsay kissing a younger man in public. "...Confronted with the undeniable photographic evidence of Lindsay’s betrayal, a humiliated Vic calls off the engagement. Following the sting operation, George comes clean to Vic about the elaborate ruse he used to get the television crew involved. Vic immediately notices George's familiar physical tic and replies, 'You forgot to turn your head. I can't believe she was lying to me the whole time.' This realization—noted because George traditionally turns his head away whenever he tells a lie—allows Vic to finally see the truth, prompting him to call off the wedding and begin a path toward reconciling with his ex-wife, Emelina."
109	7	"George Helps Angie's Wha-Positive Self-Image By Saying You 'Sta Loca Good"	Bob Koherr	John R. Morey	March 7, 2007	3T5205	5.79
In this episode, Angie becomes deeply self-conscious about aging and losing her youthful appeal. Her anxiety peaks when she fails to convince a satellite television installer to give the family a free package, while George's younger niece, Veronica, easily charms a cable worker using her sex appeal. Unbeknownst to Angie, her own failure was simply due to the satellite dish physically obstructing the installer's view of her. Nevertheless, Angie begins aggressively comparing herself to Veronica, who is nearly two decades younger. When the family is invited to an upcoming office costume party, George notices Angie's escalating insecurity and asks Veronica to tone down her wardrobe to spare Angie's feelings. However, Angie views the event as a direct challenge. "...In a desperate attempt to prove she still has it, Angie arrives at the party dressed in a highly provocative, nearly nude nurse outfit. George attempts to use his best friend's usual tendencies to boost Angie's confidence, but a masked Ernie awkwardly downplays her appearance out of respect. This prompts an irritated George to exclaim that Ernie drools over his wife every day, yet fails to call her hot the one time he is actually supposed to do it. George then confronts Angie..." After the initial shock waves and an awkward encounter where a masked Ernie tries not to stare, George confronts Angie. He reassures her that she does not need to compete with a woman in her early twenties and that there is a comfortable middle ground for how she carries herself as she ages. George comforts Angie with a realistic, humorous timeline of their marriage, telling her they still have "ten years of hot, 20 years of not bad, and 5 years of 'did that smell come from me or you?'" The episode ends with a reassured Angie agreeing to find a balance, while a secondary plot tracks Benny begrudgingly completing her court-mandated community service by driving senior citizens
110	8	"George's Grave Mistake Sends Him to a Funeral, Holmes"	Sheldon Epps	Michael Loftus	March 14, 2007	3T5207	6.19
The Lopez family is thrown into turmoil following the sudden death of Angie’s mother, Emilina. Angie is paralyzed by devastating guilt, revealing that in their final phone call just a week prior, she had lashed out at Emilina for her past infidelity against Vic, calling her a "selfish tramp" and vowing never to forgive her. Now that Emilina is gone, Angie is haunted by the fact that she will never be able to apologize. Compounding the crisis, George discovers his poor memory has led to a "grave mistake": he failed to secure a burial plot for Emilina next to the family's existing sites. While George desperately tries to negotiate a new plot to keep the family together, he works to help Angie find closure. The emotional conflict is finally resolved when George finds a sentimental book Emilina had sent to Angie before she died; the message of unconditional love within its pages finally allows Angie to forgive her mother and find peace with their complicated history.
111	9	"George Joins the Neighborhood Wha-tcha and Raises the Vigil-ante"	Sheldon Epps	Laura House	March 21, 2007	3T5208	5.92
Cris Watson (Kristin Bauer van Straten), a registered sex offender, moves into the neighborhood so George warns Max not to go to her house. Nevertheless, one of George's neighbors (Tommy Chong) alerts George that Max has gone over there, but before anything happens George and Angie come to Cris' house to find a shirtless Max with a condom; after a talk they realize it was Max's idea to come to the house to have sex with Cris, having misbelieved they persuaded him. George decides to have "the talk" with him. He gives a good speech, but Angie arrives when he begins making jokes, thinking he was giving bad advice.
112	10	"George Is Maid to be Ruth-Less"	Victor Gonzalez	Paul A. Kaplan & Mark Torgrove	April 4, 2007	3T5211	5.99
George and Angie hire a maid named Ruth (Barbara Eden) who wins George’s favor by cooking his favorite meals and treating him with maternal warmth. However, Ruth spends so much time pampering George that the actual house cleaning is neglected. Feeling threatened by George's growing bond with another mother figure, a jealous Benny steals money from Max and frames Ruth to get her fired. George eventually catches Benny in the act. When confronted, Benny reveals that her sabotage was driven by her desperate fear of being replaced in George's life. Touched by this rare display of vulnerability and love, George gives his mother a hug. Realizing the friction her presence has caused between the two, Ruth decides to quit and move on. Note: During the episode, Ruth humorously alludes to her past as a genie by stating that she wishes she could just cross her arms and blink her eyes to make the housework happen. This meta-joke is a clear nod to the magical gestures she used in (I Dream of Jeannie).
113	11	"George Is Lie-able for Benny's Unhappiness"	Joe Regalbuto	Jim Hope	April 4, 2007	3T5212	6.53
When Wayne Hill (Jerry Springer) returns to town, an old flame from thirty years ago, returns to Los Angeles to rekindle his romance with Benny, George’s childhood resentment resurfaces. Remembering how Benny once chose a date with Wayne over his Little League All-Star game, George creates an elaborate "web of lies" to keep them apart. George's primary deception is telling Wayne that Benny is dead. The lie escalates into a series of "tall tales" that include George ordering a massive floral funeral wreath to support his claim. Eventually, Benny becomes suspicious of George's odd behavior and discovers the truth, forcing George to admit that his actions were motivated by his long-held pain of being neglected for her former boyfriends
114	12	"George Uses His Vato Power to Save Dinero Que La"	Victor Gonzalez	Dave Caplan	April 11, 2007	3T5210	6.36
Concerned by their excessive spending habits, George and Angie agree to a "veto power" rule where both must approve any purchase over $100. The agreement quickly turns into a petty rivalry when Angie sends Veronica to interrupt George’s poker game as revenge for his constant use of the veto. This escalates into a brutal contest to see who can be the most frugal, leading them to live in the dark and stop using basic amenities. The contest reaches a disgusting climax when they find old cans of "Fisherman's Feast" in the pantry. George tricks Angie into eating the expired cat food to prove his commitment, though he secretly replaced his own portion with a tuna label. After Angie actually eats the cat food, they both realize the competition is destroying their marriage. They agree to a draw, deciding to be more responsible with their money without resorting to such extremes
115	13	"George Rocks to the Max and Gets Diss-Band-ed"	Andy García	John R. Morey	April 11, 2007	3T5214	6.36
George attempts to relive his unfulfilled high school "rock star" dreams by teaching Max how to play the guitar. However, George’s enthusiasm quickly turns to resentment when Max joins a garage band with his friends and moves on without his father’s guidance. Feeling used only for his garage space, George initially clashes with the boys, but after seeing Max's genuine passion, he puts aside his mid-life crisis to jam with his son. Meanwhile, Angie and Vic deal with their own frustrations regarding the band's constant noise, leading to a comedic standoff over the family's living boundaries.
116	14	"George Gets Smoking Mad at Benny and Develops an Órale Fixation"	Sheldon Epps	Paul A. Kaplan & Mark Torgrove	April 24, 2007	3T5215	4.45
When Powers Aviation implements a strict smoking ban, Benny’s severe nicotine withdrawal creates a hostile environment at the factory. After Vic mentions he "knows a guy" who specializes in behavioural therapy, a desperate Benny agrees, stating, "Vic's guy it is." During the session, they discover that George is the primary "trigger" for Benny’s smoking habit. To prevent his mother from relapsing, George begins a cycle of compulsive junk food eating as a way to suppress his own stress and keep her calm. Realizing that his own health is failing under the weight of his new eating habit and the pressure of accommodating Benny, George encourages her to quit her job. Ultimately, Benny resigns from the factory, choosing to maintain her identity as a smoker rather than change her lifestyle or her high-conflict dynamic with George.
117	15	"George Can't Let Sleeping Mexicans Lie"	Sheldon Epps	Luisa Leschin	April 24, 2007	3T5216	4.89
The Lopez family is outraged when a new neighbor displays an offensive "sleeping Mexican" lawn statue. After Benny smashes the ornament to George’s approval, the neighbor retaliates by installing multiple identical statues. Attempting to follow his grandmother's example, Max is caught on camera violently thrashing the new displays. Their friend, Officer Sanchez visits the home and shows George and Angie the incriminating video of Max’s actions. While Sanchez agrees to "let it slide" this time due to his friendship with George, he warns that any future incidents will result in Max’s arrest. Shaken by the visual proof of his son’s aggression, George scolds Max for his recklessness, while Angie pivot to a legal neighborhood petition to have the offensive art removed. Guest Starring: Mario Lopez as Officer Hector Sanchez Note: This episode features a running gag where George keeps saying the neighbor's garden gnome looks like Benny; "Put my mom in a pointy hat and let her beard grow, they could be twins".
118	16	"George's Bogey-ous Relationship with Vic Is Putt to the Test"	Joe Regalbuto	Rick Nyholm	May 1, 2007	3T5213	4.61
George who frequently struggles with feelings of loneliness on Father’s Day due to never knowing his own father, Vic invites him to play as his "son" in a prestigious father-son golf tournament. The duo competes against Vic's longtime nemesis, Dr. Anthony Tovar,(Eloy Casados) and his son, Tony (played by Oscar De La Hoya). However, George's excitement sours when he discovers that Vic’s display of fatherly love was merely a ruse to secure George's superior golfing skills for the sake of winning a petty bet. Infuriated by the manipulation, George intentionally sabotages the match and "throws the game" to spite Vic. While the day ends in mutual frustration, Vic later attempts to apologize with a series of characteristic "bribes," including cigars and ice cream, leading to a grudging truce between the two.
119	17	"George Thinks Max's Future Is on the Line"	Joe Regalbuto	Dave Caplan	May 8, 2007	3T5217RX	4.60
George puts Max to work at the factory (to clean up the place) to emphasize the importance of education and to pay for a new computer because he broke it, but Max soon wants to stay at the factory forever; Max is thanked and congratulated for all his work by the employees, while he never got any of that in school. George accepts this at first, but has one of his nightmares: a fast-forward to 20 years in the future. George is still in good health, while Benny is on an oxygen tank and had to give up smoking. Ernie then reveals that their jobs have been taken by robots (which are sentient in this dream). A disheartened Max blames George for not making him get a better education. Startled by this possibility, George forces Max to get an education; however, Max agrees so long as he has the option of returning to the factory. Powers Aviation's workers are worried when a rumor spreads that the new owner of the factory is moving it to Mexico and everyone loses their jobs.
120	18	"George Decides to Sta-Local Where It's Familia"	Joe Regalbuto	Bruce Helford	May 8, 2007	3T5218RX	4.60
In the two-part series finale, Powers Aviation is acquired by Enrique Vega (Edward James Olmos) a shrewd multimillionaire businessman. Vega approaches George with a lucrative promotion to remain with the company under the condition that he uproots his family and relocates to Phoenix, Arizona. Recognizing the financial stability it would bring, George initially intends to accept the offer. However, when word spreads about the factory's impending corporate transition, the assembly-line workers face systemic layoffs. Realizing the devastating impact this will have on his lifelong friends, George decides to take a stand. Led by his childhood best friend Ernie Cardenas , the workers rally around George, expressing how deeply they will miss his leadership and advocacy. Moved by their loyalty, George reverses his decision to relocate and joins the workers in staging a full factory boycott. Amid the strike, Vega threatens to terminate the entire staff until he uncovers a critical financial loophole: maintaining the factory's original, localized workforce qualifies his conglomerate for substantial government tax credits. Seizing the financial incentive, Vega agrees to meet the workers' demands and preserve their jobs. Concurrently, the factory's former incompetent corporate executives, Jack and Mel, officially depart the company. With a vacant leadership structure at the plant, Vega rewards George's fierce loyalty and operational knowledge by promoting him to run the entire Los Angeles facility independently. The series concludes with George successfully saving his community's livelihood and firmly establishing himself as the ultimate head of the factory where he once started as an assembly-line worker.

== Viewing figures ==
=== Seasons 1–3 ===
George Lopez : U.S. viewers per episode (millions)

Season	Episode number																											
Season	1	2	3	4	5	6	7	8	9	10	11	12	13	14	15	16	17	18	19	20	21	22	23	24	25	26	27	28
1	10.43	8.96	9.33	7.36	–																							
2	11.44	11.76	12.74	12.24	11.63	11.43	11.54	13.45	9.68	11.33	11.06	10.96	11.11	10.28	11.22	10.60	10.06	10.73	9.41	8.64	8.04	8.33	9.24	8.47	–			
3	9.03	9.03	7.61	8.18	8.61	8.33	7.34	8.51	7.86	7.49	8.58	7.04	8.36	8.35	7.95	7.27	7.70	7.56	7.10	8.16	6.75	6.39	6.89	7.00	6.50	6.58	7.16	7.16

Audience measurement performed by Nielsen Media Research

=== Seasons 4–6 ===
George Lopez : U.S. viewers per episode (millions)

Season	Episode number																							
Season	1	2	3	4	5	6	7	8	9	10	11	12	13	14	15	16	17	18	19	20	21	22	23	24
4	8.39	9.08	8.54	8.59	8.70	8.50	8.73	8.38	8.85	11.19	9.14	6.02	6.92	6.66	6.05	6.34	8.47	7.66	7.52	6.51	5.59	5.65	5.47	6.57
5	9.13	9.13	8.75	7.94	8.50	7.34	7.92	8.13	7.93	8.08	7.16	6.31	5.83	6.40	6.16	5.90	5.40	6.71	7.24	6.63	6.07	6.81	–	
6	6.08	7.71	7.03	7.13	5.83	6.04	5.79	6.19	5.92	5.99	6.53	6.36	6.36	4.45	4.89	4.61	4.60	4.60	–					

Audience measurement performed by Nielsen Media Research
