= Bryan Fisher =

American actor (born 1980)

- Born: August 1, 1980 (age 46)
- Occupation: Actor
- Years active: 2001–present

Bryan Fisher (born August 1, 1980) is an American actor who is best known for his role as Jason McNamara, Carmen's boyfriend in George Lopez. He has also guest starred in many other shows such as The Invisible Man, The Chronicle, and also starred in the 2006 TV movie Jekyll + Hyde.

== Filmography ==
Year	Title	Role	Notes
2001	The Invisible Man	Jaimie Monger	Episode: "Flowers for Hobbes"
2001	The Chronicle	Brad	Episode: "He's Dead, She's Dead"
2001	Undressed	Stanley	Unknown episodes
2002	Do Over	Mike Carusso / Indiana Jones	Appearance
2003	The O'Keefes	Steve	
2003–2005	George Lopez	Jason McNamara	13 episodes
2004	Surviving Christmas	Steve	Minor
2005	House of Grimm	Unknown	Main
2006	Jekyll + Hyde	Henry 'J' Jekyll / Hyde	Main
2009	Without a Trace	Jimmy	Episode: "Friends and Neighbors"
2009	He's Such a Girl	Whitney	Main Role
2010	In Plain Sight	Bryan	Episode: "WitSec Stepmother"
