= George Lopez (TV series) =

American sitcom (2002–2007)

- Genre: Sitcom
- Created by: Bruce Helford; George Lopez; Robert Borden
- Showrunners: Bruce Helford; Robert Borden
- Starring: George Lopez; Constance Marie; Valente Rodriguez; Masiela Lusha; Luis Armand Garcia; Belita Moreno; Emiliano Díez; Aimee Garcia
- Theme music composer: Thomas Allen; Harold Ray Brown; Morris Dickerson; Gerald Goldstein; Lonnie Jordan; Lee Levitin; Charles Miller; Howard E. Scott
- Opening theme: "Low Rider" by War
- Ending theme: Instrumental closing theme, composed by Nicholas "Aqua" McCarrell (select episodes of seasons 2–6 seen in syndication)
- Composers: W. G. Snuffy Walden (season 1); Nicholas "Aqua" McCarrell (seasons 2–6)
- Country of origin: United States
- Original language: English
- No. of seasons: 6
- No. of episodes: 120 (list of episodes)

Production
- Executive producers: Bruce Helford; Deborah Oppenheimer; Sandra Bullock; Robert Borden; Dave Caplan (seasons 3–6); Mark Torgove; Paul A. Kaplan; George Lopez (seasons 4–6)
- Production locations: Los Angeles, California
- Cinematography: Peter Smokler
- Editors: Larry Harris ("Prototype"); Pam Marshall
- Running time: 22 minutes
- Production companies: Fortis Productions; Mohawk Productions; Warner Bros. Television

Original release
- Network: ABC
- Release: March 27, 2002 – May 8, 2007

George Lopez, commonly referred to as The George Lopez Show, is an American sitcom created by George Lopez, Bruce Helford and Robert Borden, which originally aired for six seasons, consisting of 120 episodes, on ABC from March 27, 2002, to May 8, 2007. Helford and Borden also served as showrunners and as executive producers. The series stars Lopez as a fictionalized version of himself, featuring his professional and personal lives in Los Angeles, California.

== Series synopsis ==
The season 4 cast of George Lopez (from left to right): Valente Rodriguez as Ernie Cardenas, Constance Marie with Luis Armand Garcia as Angie and Max Lopez, Emiliano Díez as Vic Palmero, Belita Moreno as Benny Lopez, George Lopez as himself, and Masiela Lusha as Carmen Lopez.

The comedy revolves around a fictionalized portrayal of Lopez who works at the Powers Brothers aviation factory. George Lopez raises daughter Stargirl and dyslexic son Max with his wife Angie, after surviving a miserable, dysfunctional childhood at the hands of his neglectful alcoholic mother Benny, who is portrayed as selfish and cold-hearted. Other characters include Angie's indulgent father, wealthy doctor Vic Palmero, who is not very fond of George at first; and George's best childhood friend Ernie Cardenas, noted for his socially-awkward behavior and unsuccessful attempts at dating. After Carmen's departure from the series, Angie's overindulged niece Veronica moved in, laden with a large trust fund that is entrusted to George's care.

Multiple storylines in the series are established through the unveiling of a secret guarded by Benny throughout George's whole childhood, most notably the discovery that his father Manny is still alive after Benny had convinced George that he died. Throughout the second and third seasons, George tries to locate his father; when Manny is finally introduced, he turns out to be a stubborn but successful businessman in Phoenix, Arizona, and is now married to a woman named Lydia, with whom he has more children, including a second George Lopez. Manny's personality was commonly depicted as being abusive toward his son and former wife in his early appearances. Upon meeting as adults and George about to donate a kidney to Manny, he dies of kidney disease. Much to George's fury, a final letter from Manny prohibited him and his family from attending his funeral in protection of his reputation.

== Episodes ==
Season	Episodes	Originally released		Rank	Viewers (in millions)
Season	Episodes	First released	Last released	Rank	Viewers (in millions)
1	4	March 27, 2002	April 17, 2002	70	9.0
2	24	October 2, 2002	May 14, 2003	50	10.4
3	28	September 26, 2003	May 21, 2004	96	7.4
4	24	September 28, 2004	May 17, 2005	79	7.2
5	22	October 5, 2005	April 12, 2006	82	7.2
6	18	January 24, 2007	May 8, 2007	95	6.1

== Characters ==
Character	Portrayed by	Seasons					
Character	Portrayed by	1	2	3	4	5	6
George Edward Lopez	George Lopez	Main	Main	Main	Main	Main	Main
Angelina "Angie" Lopez (née Palmero)	Constance Marie	Main	Main	Main	Main	Main	Main
Ernesto "Ernie" Cardenas	Valente Rodriguez	Main	Main	Main	Main	Main	Main
Maximilian "Max" Lopez	Luis Armand Garcia	Main	Main	Main	Main	Main	Main
Carmen Lopez	Masiela Lusha	Main	Main	Main	Main	Main	Guest (Note: Due to a creative difference between Lopez and Lusha, Carmen was written out of the sixth season, only appearing in the premiere episode George's Mom Faces Hard Tambien, with archival footage of Lusha being used as well as being portrayed at a younger age by an uncredited actress.)
Benita "Benny" Lopez (née Diaz)	Belita Moreno	Main	Main	Main	Main	Main	Main
Dr. Victor "Vic" Garcia Lantigua Palmero	Emiliano Díez		Recurring	Recurring	Main	Main	Main
Veronica Ann Palmero	Aimee Garcia					Recurring	Main

== Production ==
=== Conception ===
Comedian George Lopez had been performing standup throughout the early 1990s, expressing interest in having his own comedy television show like Seinfeld. Lopez hoped to play a professional, and refused to do roles that were demeaning to Latinos, vowing never to play a murderer, drug dealer or gang member. With an absence of TV deals, he continued to perform standup through the 1990s and into the 2000s. In August 2000, after being given one of Lopez's comedy albums to listen to, actress Sandra Bullock saw Lopez perform live at the Brea Improv Comedy Club. Bullock had been interested in developing a TV show with a Latino storyline, being concerned about the lack of visibility for Latinos on American television. Bullock approached Lopez backstage after the show and made her pitch to produce and star in a situational comedy centered around the comedian.

Though Bullock had connections through Hollywood, The George Lopez Show was not an easy sell. Bullock sought the help of Bruce Helford (who created The Drew Carey Show and had been a head writer for Roseanne), and, due to his history with ABC on those shows, became a co-creator and executive producer of Lopez's show. Bullock, Helford, and two of the show's other executive producers met with ABC executives later that month, and the network tested the show with 4 episodes, before committing to 13 episodes the following fall and eventually adding an additional 9. Lopez was given full starring, creator, producer and writer credits for the show. The George Lopez Show was seen as an attempt from ABC to diversify their programming, while still appealing to the widest possible audience. ABC executives were hopeful that Lopez's humor and relatability would draw a large family audience, focusing on marketing the series as much as possible. The network bought promotional time for the show on Spanish-language networks, and took out full-page ads in some magazines.

Lopez drew much of the material for the show from his own life experiences, especially his upbringing in the San Fernando Valley. Upon the series debut, Lopez became one of the few Latinos to star in a television comedy series, following in the footsteps of Desi Arnaz, Freddie Prinze, and John Leguizamo.

=== Casting ===
For the first five seasons, the show had an all-Latino cast with the exception of Albanian born American actress Masiela Lusha, who played George's daughter Carmen. During the show's fifth season, Aimee Garcia was cast as George's niece, Veronica.

=== Music ===
The show's theme song is "Low Rider", performed by War. The theme plays in the opening credits and was present when the show aired on ABC as well as syndication, but was replaced in the DVD releases of all seasons except 1 episode due to licensing costs. At the 9th ALMA Awards in 2007, George Lopez called the song the "Chicano National Anthem".

== Cancellation ==
The series finale aired on May 8, 2007, after the show was canceled by ABC. According to Lopez, ABC prime-time entertainment president Steve McPherson called him over the weekend and explained that the network would lose money if the show was picked up again, and that it wasn't doing well financially. Lopez stated that the explanation was "painful to hear," noting that the show had four different time slots in only five years and had to constantly compete against shows like American Idol, yet the final season of the show was still able to outperform a comedy series that was renewed by ABC: Notes from the Underbelly. Lopez said that ABC "dealt with us from the bottom of the deck" and that it was "hard to take after what was a good run."

Lopez attributed the cancellation in part to the fact that the show was not produced directly by ABC Studios, but instead by Warner Bros. Television. Lopez also criticized ABC's decision to approve the show Cavemen, being perplexed at the circumstances: "So a Chicano can't be on TV, but a caveman can?" According to Lopez, 170 staff members who worked on the show lost their jobs. Lopez explained that he "took the five years of good, and I did a lot with the good. My popularity, I was involved in charities, I overcame my illness, all on TV. I shared all of that with America—every secret I had... Every emotion. Everything was open to the show. And what happens?"

In 2021, Lopez revealed that a reboot of the show was sold to Netflix several years prior but a former Warner Bros. Television president had squashed the potential series and "made a point to purposely not have the reboot ever happen".

== Distribution ==
=== Broadcast and syndication ===
The show entered syndication one month after the series finale on ABC, and is distributed by Warner Bros. Television Distribution. The show aired in broadcast syndication on independent stations, and affiliates of Fox, The CW and MyNetworkTV as well as The CW Plus stations in the United States from 2007 to 2011 and on Telelatino in Canada. The show moved to ION Television on Thursday, Sept. 29, 2011. George Lopez aired on TBS from 2020 until 2023.

On March 8, 2007, it was announced that George Lopez would join the Nick at Nite lineup. It first aired on Nick at Nite on September 10, 2007—it was the most current non-original show to air on Nick at Nite To this date, it continues to be their highest-rated series and one of cable's best for an off-network sitcom. On September 9, 2020, the show was removed from syndication on Nick at Nite, ending its almost 13-year run on the network. The series was also shown on Paramount Global sister networks MTV Tres and TV Land.

The series came to Cozi TV on September 1, 2025, beginning with a Labor Day marathon, then joined the official lineup the following day on September 2. Currently, it airs weekday afternoons from 2:00pm to 4:00pm ET and weeknights from 11:00pm to 1:00am ET.

Never a major hit in primetime, the show became an unexpected success in syndication. Many markets also moved the show from overnight timeslots to more desirable ones.

Episodes from the first four seasons of George Lopez do not use those respective seasons' opening titles, the season five version is used instead (this is evident as Emiliano Diez is credited in the sequence, which is slightly longer than how they were originally broadcast on ABC, though there is also a short version also used in syndication that also differs from the original short opening credits that does not credit him for seasons 1–3, even though Diez did not make his first guest appearance until season two and did not become a cast regular until season four); the final two seasons use those seasons' appropriate versions of the opening credits.

=== Home media ===
On April 17, 2007, Warner Home Video released seasons 1 and 2 on DVD in Region 1. After over six years since the release of the first and second seasons, Warner Home Video released the third season on July 16, 2013. The fourth season was released on June 23, 2015. The fifth season was released on August 18, 2015. The sixth and final season was released on November 24, 2015.

=== Online media ===
The complete series was also published in high definition on the iTunes Store and Amazon Video. The show's theme song "Low Rider" is intact in these releases. The series became available to stream on Peacock on July 15, 2020.

It is also available on Hulu and Disney+.

== Reception ==
=== Ratings ===
Season	Timeslot	Season premiere	Season finale	TV season	Rank	Viewers (in millions)
1	Wednesday 8:30 pm	March 27, 2002	April 17, 2002	2002	70	9.0
2	Wednesday 8:30 pm	October 2, 2002	May 14, 2003	2002–03	50	10.4
3	Friday 8:00 pm	September 26, 2003	May 21, 2004	2003–04	96	7.4
4	Tuesday 8:30 pm	September 28, 2004	May 17, 2005	2004–05	79	7.2
5	Wednesday 8:00 pm	October 5, 2005	April 12, 2006	2005–06	82	7.2
6	Wednesday 8:00 pm	January 24, 2007	May 8, 2007	2007	95	6.1

=== Accolades ===
Association	Year	Category	Nominee(s)	Result	Ref
ALMA Awards	2006	Outstanding Actor in a Television Series	George Lopez	Nominated	
ALMA Awards	2006	Outstanding Actress in a Television Series	Belita Moreno	Nominated	
ALMA Awards	2006	Outstanding Script for a Television Drama or Comedy (for episode "George Discovers Benny's Silli-Con Job")	Luisa Leschin	Nominated	
ALMA Awards	2007	Outstanding Television Series, Miniseries or Television Movie	George Lopez	Nominated	
ALMA Awards	2007	Outstanding Actress — Television Series, Miniseries or Television Movie	Constance Marie	Nominated	
ALMA Awards	2007	Outstanding Supporting Actress — Television Series, Miniseries or Television Movie	Aimee Garcia	Nominated	
ALMA Awards	2007	Outstanding Supporting Actress — Television Series, Miniseries or Television Movie	Belita Moreno	Nominated	
ASCAP Film and Television Music Awards	2003	Top TV Series	Harold R. Brown; Lonnie Jordan; Charlies Miller; Howard E. Scott	Won	
BET Comedy Awards	2004	Outstanding Comedy Series	George Lopez	Nominated	
BET Comedy Awards	2004	Outstanding Lead Actor in a Comedy Series	George Lopez	Nominated	
Casting Society of America	2002	Best Casting for TV, Comedy Pilot ("Prototype")	Mary V. Buck; Susan Edelman	Nominated	
Emmy Awards (Creative Arts)	2004	Outstanding Cinematography for a Multi-Camera Series (for episode "Bringing Home the Bacon")	Peter Smokler	Nominated	
Emmy Awards (Creative Arts)	2005	Outstanding Art Direction for a Multi-Camera Series (for episode "Leave it to Lopez/"The Simple Life"/"Trouble in Paradise")	John Shaffner; Judi Giovanni	Won	
GLAAD Media Awards	2003	Outstanding Individual Episode (In a Series Without a Regular Gay Character) (for episode "Guess Who's Coming to Dinner, Honey?")	George Lopez	Nominated	
Humanitas Prize Awards	2006	30 Minute Network Syndicated Television (for episode "The Kidney Stays in the Picture")	Jim Hope	Nominated	
Image Awards (NAACP)	2004	Outstanding Actor in a Comedy Series	George Lopez	Nominated	
Image Awards (NAACP)	2005	Outstanding Actor in a Comedy Series	George Lopez	Nominated	
Image Awards (NAACP)	2006	Outstanding Actor in a Comedy Series	George Lopez	Nominated	
Image Awards (NAACP)	2007	Outstanding Actor in a Comedy Series	George Lopez	Nominated	
Imagen Foundation Awards	2003	Best Primetime Comedy Series — Television	George Lopez	Won	
Imagen Foundation Awards	2004	Best Primetime Series — Comedy	George Lopez	Won	
Imagen Foundation Awards	2004	Best Actor in a Television Comedy	George Lopez	Won	
Imagen Foundation Awards	2004	Best Actress in a Television Comedy	Constance Marie	Won	
Imagen Foundation Awards	2004	Best Supporting Actress in a Television Comedy	Belita Moreno	Won	
Imagen Foundation Awards	2005	Best Primetime Series	George Lopez	Nominated	
Imagen Foundation Awards	2005	Best Actor — Television	George Lopez	Nominated	
Imagen Foundation Awards	2005	Best Actress — Television	Constance Marie	Nominated	
Imagen Foundation Awards	2006	Best Primetime Series	George Lopez	Nominated	
Imagen Foundation Awards	2006	Best Actor — Television	George Lopez	Nominated	
Imagen Foundation Awards	2006	Best Actress — Television	Constance Marie	Nominated	
Imagen Foundation Awards	2007	Best Primetime Program	George Lopez	Nominated	
Imagen Foundation Awards	2007	Best Actor — Television	George Lopez	Nominated	
Imagen Foundation Awards	2007	Best Actress — Television	Constance Marie	Nominated	
Imagen Foundation Awards	2007	Best Supporting Actress — Television	Aimee Garcia	Nominated	
Teen Choice Awards	2003	Choice TV Breakout Show	George Lopez	Nominated	
Teen Choice Awards	2003	Choice TV Breakout Star — Male	George Lopez	Nominated	
Young Artist Awards	2003	Best Family Television Series (Comedy or Drama)	George Lopez	Won	
Young Artist Awards	2003	Best Performance in a TV Series (Comedy or Drama) — Leading Young Actress	Masiela Lusha	Won	
Young Artist Awards	2003	Best Performance in a TV Series (Comedy or Drama) — Young Actor Ten or Under	Luis Armand Garcia	Nominated	
Young Artist Awards	2004	Best Performance in a TV Series (Comedy or Drama) — Leading Young Actress	Masiela Lusha	Won	
Young Artist Awards	2004	Most Popular Mom & Pop in a Television Series	George Lopez; Constance Marie	Nominated	
Young Artist Awards	2005	Best Performance in a Television Series — Recurring Young Actor	J.B. Gaynor	Nominated	
