= War discography =

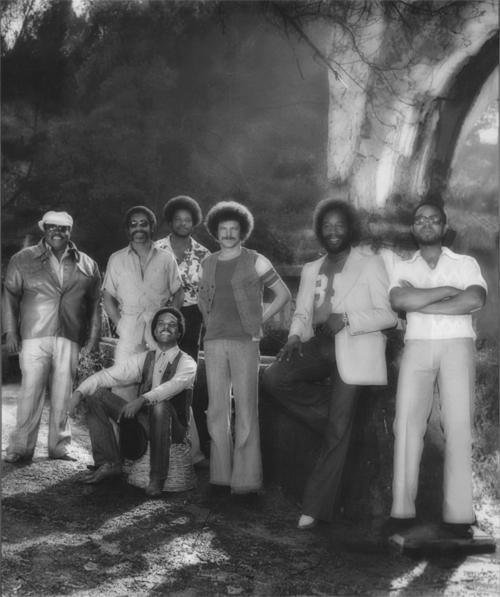
- The original lineup of War in 1976
- Studio albums: 17
- Live albums: 3
- Compilation albums: 8
- Singles: 60

The American funk, rock and soul band War (originally Eric Burdon and War) has released eighteen studio albums, three live albums, seven compilation albums, and sixty singles.

== Studio albums ==
Title	Album details	Peak chart positions						Certifications
Title	Album details	US	US R&B	CA	AUS	GE	UK	Certifications
Eric Burdon Declares "War"	As "Eric Burdon and War"; Released: 1970; Label: MGM Records	18	47	11	7	14	50	
The Black-Man's Burdon	As "Eric Burdon and War"; Released: 1970; Label: MGM Records	28	31	38	15	20	21	
War	Released: 1971; Label: United Artists Records	190	42	—	—	—	—	
All Day Music	Released: 1971; Label: United Artists Records	16	6	53	—	—	—	RIAA: Gold
The World Is a Ghetto	Released: 1972; Label: United Artists Records	1	1	7	—	—	—	RIAA: Gold
Deliver the Word	Released: 1973; Label: United Artists Records	6	1	23	—	—	—	RIAA: Gold
Why Can't We Be Friends?	Released: 1975; Label: United Artists Records	8	1	8	81	—	—	RIAA: Gold
Love Is All Around	As "Eric Burdon and War"; Released: 1976; Label: ABC Records	140	—	—	—	—	—	
Platinum Jazz	Released: 1976; Label: United Artists	6	7	60	—	—	—	RIAA: Gold
Galaxy	Released: 1977; Label: MCA Records	15	6	12	53	—	—	RIAA: Gold
Youngblood (Original Motion Picture Soundtrack)	Released: 1978; Label: United Artist Records	69	40	—	—	—	—	
The Music Band	Released: 1979; Label: MCA Records	41	11	38	—	—	—	RIAA: Gold
The Music Band 2	Released: 1979; Label: MCA Records	111	34	—	—	—	—	
Outlaw	Released: 1982; Label: RCA Records	48	15	—	—	—	—	
The Music Band – Jazz	Released: 1983; Label: MCA Records	—	—	—	—	—	—	
Life (Is So Strange)	Released: 1983; Label: RCA Records	164	36	—	—	—	—	
Where There's Smoke	Released: 1985; Label: Coco Plum	—	—	—	—	—	—	
Peace Sign	Released: 1994; Label: Avenue Records	200	52	—	—	—	—	
Evolutionary	Released: 2014; Label: UMe; Double album: half new music, half greatest hits	123	37	—	—	—	—	
"—" denotes releases that did not chart.

== Live albums ==
Title	Album details	Peak chart positions			Certifications
Title	Album details	US	US R&B	CA	Certifications
War Live	Released: 1974; Label: United Artists Records; Double album	13	1	17	RIAA: Gold
The Music Band Live	Released: 1980; Label: MCA Records	—	—	—	
Greatest Hits Live	Released: 2008; Label: Rhino Records; Format: DVD	—	—	—	
Live In Japan 1974	Released: 2025; Label: Avenue Records	—	—	—	
"—" denotes releases that did not chart.

== Compilation albums ==
Title	Album details	Peak chart positions		Certifications
Title	Album details	US Pop	US R&B	Certifications
Greatest Hits	Released: 1976; Label: United Artists Records; Includes one new track	6	12	RIAA: Platinum
Platinum Jazz	Released: 1976; Label: Blue Note Records; Double album: half compilation, half new material	6	7	RIAA: Gold
The Best of the Music Band	Released: 1982; Label: MCA Records	—	—	
The Best of War... and More	Released: 1987; Label: Avenue Records; Includes two new tracks and a remix	156	—	RIAA: Platinum
Best of Eric Burdon and War	Released: 1995; Label: Avenue Records	—	—	
Anthology (1970–1994)	Released: 1996; Label: Avenue Records; Double Album	—	—	
Grooves and Messages	Released: 1999; Label: Avenue Records; Double album: half compilation, half remixes	—	—	
The Very Best of War	Released: 2003; Label: Avenue Records; Double Album	—	—	
Icon: The Hits	Released: 2010; Label: Far Out/Hip-O	—	—	
Icon 2: The Hits & More	Released: 2011; Label: Far Out/Hip-O	—	—	
Greatest Hits 2.0	Released: 2021; Label: Avenue/Rhino; Note: 2CD reissue of their 1976 album Greatest Hits	—	—	
"—" denotes releases that did not chart.

== Singles ==
This is a list of their US singles; additional singles were issued in other countries.

List of singles, with selected chart positions and certifications
Title	Year	Peak chart positions				Certifications	Album
Title	Year	US	US R&B	CAN	UK	Certifications	Album
"Spill the Wine": "Magic Mountain"; Eric Burdon & War	1970	3	—	3	—		Eric Burdon Declares "War"
"They Can't Take Away Our Music" -"Home Cookin'" (A- or B-side) Eric Burdon & War	1970	50	—	35	—		The Black-Man's Burdon
"Sun Oh Sun": "Lonely Feelin'"	1971	—	38	—	—		War
"All Day Music": "Get Down"	1971	35	18	35	—		All Day Music
"Slippin' into Darkness": "Nappy Head"	1972	16	12	13	—	RIAA: Gold	
"The World Is a Ghetto": "Four Cornered Room"	1972	7	3	39	—	RIAA: Gold	The World Is a Ghetto
"The Cisco Kid": "Beetles in the Bog"	1972	2	5	1	—	RIAA: Gold	The World Is a Ghetto
"Gypsy Man": "Deliver the Word"	1973	8	6	16	—		Deliver the Word
"Me and Baby Brother": "In Your Eyes"	1973	15	18	10	—		Deliver the Word
"Ballero" (Live): "Slippin' into Darkness" (Live)	1974	33	17	24	—		War Live
"Why Can't We Be Friends?": "In Mazatlan"	1975	6	9	6	—	RIAA: Gold	Why Can't We Be Friends?
"Low Rider": "So"	1975	7	1	6	12	RIAA: Gold; BPI: Silver	Why Can't We Be Friends?
"Me and Baby Brother" (reissue): "In Your Eyes"	1976	—	—	—	21		Deliver the Word
"Summer": "All Day Music"	1976	7	4	10	—	RIAA: Gold	Greatest Hits
"L.A. Sunshine": "Slowly We Walk Together"	1977	45	2	—	—		Platinum Jazz
"Galaxy": "Galaxy Part II"	1978	39	5	42	14		Galaxy
"Hey Señorita": "Street Fighting Lady"	1978	—	70	—	40		Galaxy
"Youngblood (Livin' in the Streets)": "Youngblood (Livin' in the Streets) Part II"	1978	—	21	—	—		Youngblood: Original Motion Picture Soundtrack
"Sing a Happy Song": "This Funky Music Makes You Feel Good"	1978	—	87	—	—		Youngblood: Original Motion Picture Soundtrack
"Good, Good, Feelin'": "Baby Face (She Said Do Do Do Do)"	1979	101	12	—	—		The Music Band
"I'm the One Who Understands": "Corns and Callouses (Hey Dr. Shoals)"	1979	Promo only					The Music Band
"Don't Take It Away": "The Music Band 2 (We Are the Music Band)"	1979	—	32	—	—		The Music Band 2
"I'll Be Around"	1980	—	96	—	—		The Music Band 2
"Cinco De Mayo": "Don't Let No One Get You Down"	1981	—	90	—	—		Outlaw
"You Got the Power": "Cinco De Mayo"	1982	66	18	—	58		Outlaw
"Outlaw": "I'm About Somebody"	1982	94	13	—	—		Outlaw
"Just Because": "The Jungle (Medley)"	1982	—	—	—	—		Outlaw
"Life (Is So Strange)": "W.W. III"	1983	—	50	—	—		Life (Is So Strange)
"Groovin'": "Groovin'" (instrumental)	1985	—	79	—	43		Where There's Smoke
"Livin' in the Red"	1987	—	98	—	—		The Best of War ...and More
"Low Rider" (Remix by Arthur Baker): "Low Rider" (original)	1987	—	59	—	—		The Best of War ...and More
"Peace Sign": Remixes of "Peace Sign"	1994	—	64	—	—		Peace Sign
"—" denotes releases that did not chart.

== Related albums ==
- 1970s: The Other Side of War Warms Your Heart (double LP of early instrumental tracks, credited to an early version of War comprising session men that apparently includes Brown, Dickerson and Jordan, with Bobby Womack guesting on guitar, released around 1973, though possibly not an official release)
- 1992: Rap Declares War (various artists, with sampling taken from War)
- 1997: War Stories (solo album by Lonnie Jordan, includes cover versions of six songs previously recorded by War)
