= The Very Best of War =

Greatest hits album by War
- Released: July 15, 2003
- Recorded: 1970–1994
- Genre: Latin rock; soul; R&B
- Label: Avenue; Rhino

War chronology
Grooves and Messages (1999)	The Very Best of War (2003)	Greatest Hits Live (2008)

Professional ratings
Review scores
Source	Rating
AllMusic	4.5/5 stars
Soul and Jazz and Funk	4/5 stars

The Very Best of War is a two-disc compilation album by American rhythm and blues band War, which features tracks from 1970 to 1994. It was issued in 2003 on Avenue Records, distributed by Rhino Records, and is similar to an earlier compilation, Anthology: 1970–1994 issued in 1994 by the same labels.

== The Very Best of War track listing ==
=== Disc one ===
Track	Title	Time	Notes	From the album
1	"Spill the Wine"	4:53	full version	Eric Burdon Declares "War" (Eric Burdon and War)
2	"Tobacco Road"	3:58	reprise section	Eric Burdon Declares "War" (Eric Burdon and War)
3	"All Day Music"	3:59		All Day Music
4	"Slippin' into Darkness"	3:47	edited from 7:00	All Day Music
5	"Get Down"	4:29		All Day Music
6	"Nappy Head (Theme from Ghetto Man)"	3:19	edited from 6:05	All Day Music
7	"The World Is a Ghetto"	4:08	edited from 10:10	The World Is a Ghetto
8	"City, Country, City"	3:54	edited from 13:18	The World Is a Ghetto
9	"The Cisco Kid"	3:48	edited from 4:35	The World Is a Ghetto
10	"Where Was You At"	3:25		The World Is a Ghetto
11	"Four Cornered Room"	5:10	edited from 8:30	The World Is a Ghetto
12	"Gypsy Man"	5:23	edited from 11:35	Deliver the Word
13	"Me and Baby Brother"	3:31		Deliver the Word
14	"Deliver the Word"	4:39	edited from 7:48	Deliver the Word
15	"Southern Part of Texas"	3:53	edited from 6:22	Deliver the Word
16	"Ballero"	3:26	live; edited from 8:29	War Live
17	"Why Can't We Be Friends?"	3:49		Why Can't We Be Friends?

=== Disc two ===
Track	Title	Time	Notes	From the album
1	"Low Rider"	3:11		Why Can't We Be Friends?
2	"Don't Let No One Get You Down"	4:01		Why Can't We Be Friends?
3	"Heartbeat"	4:11	edited from 7:25	Why Can't We Be Friends?
4	"Smile Happy"	4:23	edited from 7:22	Why Can't We Be Friends?
5	"So"	4:59		Why Can't We Be Friends?
6	"Summer"	4:03	edited from 6:39	Greatest Hits
7	"L.A. Sunshine"	4:01	edited from 11:52	Platinum Jazz
8	"River Niger"	5:17	edited from 8:40	Platinum Jazz
9	"Galaxy"	4:46	edited from 8:09	Galaxy
10	"Youngblood (Livin' in the Streets)"	4:02	edited from 10:43	Youngblood (soundtrack)
11	"I'm the One Who Understands"	4:50	edited from 6:08	The Music Band
12	"Cinco de Mayo"	4:07	edited from 5:34	Outlaw
13	"You Got the Power"	4:02	edited from 5:41	Outlaw
14	"Outlaw"	3:59	edited from 5:02	Outlaw
15	"Baby It's Cold Outside"	5:56		Outlaw
16	"Peace Sign"	4:29	shorter LP version	☮ (Peace Sign)
17	"East L.A."	5:41		☮ (Peace Sign)

== Anthology track listing ==
=== Disc one ===
Track	Title	From the album
1	"Tobacco Road"	Eric Burdon Declares "War" (Eric Burdon and War)
2	"Spill the Wine"	Eric Burdon Declares "War" (Eric Burdon and War)
3	"They Can't Take Away Our Music"	The Black-Man's Burdon (Eric Burdon and War)
4	"Sun Oh Son"	War
5	"Lonely Feelin'"	War
6	"All Day Music"	All Day Music
7	"Get Down"	All Day Music
8	"Slippin' into Darkness"	All Day Music
9	"The Cisco Kid"	The World Is a Ghetto
10	"The World Is a Ghetto"	The World Is a Ghetto
11	"City, Country, City"	The World Is a Ghetto
12	"Where Was You At"	The World Is a Ghetto
13	"Gypsy Man"	Deliver the Word
14	"Me and Baby Brother"	Deliver the Word
15	"Deliver the Word"	Deliver the Word
16	"Ballero"	War Live

=== Disc two ===
Track	Title	From the album
1	"Why Can't We Be Friends?"	Why Can't We Be Friends?
2	"Low Rider"	Why Can't We Be Friends?
3	"Don't Let No One Get You Down"	Why Can't We Be Friends?
4	"Summer"	Greatest Hits
5	"L.A. Sunshine"	Platinum Jazz
6	"River Niger"	Platinum Jazz
7	"Galaxy"	Galaxy
8	"Youngblood (Livin' in the Streets)"	Youngblood (soundtrack)
9	"The Funky Music Makes You Feel Good"	Youngblood (soundtrack)
10	"The Music Band"	The Music Band
11	"Outlaw"	Outlaw
12	"You Got the Power"	Outlaw
13	"Cinco de Mayo"	Outlaw
14	"Life (Is So Strange)"	Life (Is So Strange)
15	"Don't Let No One Get You Down"	Rap Declares War (various artists compilation, track by War with Hispanic M.C.'s)
16	"Peace Sign"	☮ (Peace Sign)
