= Glee: The Music, Volume 1 =

Soundtrack album by Glee Cast
- Released: November 2, 2009
- Recorded: 2009
- Genre: Pop
- Length: 60:13
- Label: Columbia / 20th Century Fox TV
- Producers: Dante Di Loreto, Brad Falchuk, Adam Anders, Peer Åström, James Levine, Ryan Murphy

Glee Cast chronology
Glee: The Music, Volume 1 (2009)	Glee: The Music, Volume 2 (2009)

Glee: The Music, Volume 1 is the debut soundtrack album by the cast of the musical television series Glee, which aired on Fox in the United States. It features cover versions from the first nine episodes of the first season and was released on November 2, 2009 by Columbia Records and 20th Century Fox Television Records. The album received mixed reviews from critics, with many praising large ensemble numbers, but comparing it to karaoke tracks. It went to number one on album charts in Ireland and the United Kingdom, and peaked at number three in Australia and number four in both Canada and the United States. Volume 1 has been certified Platinum in these five countries.

All non-bonus tracks from the album have been released as digital singles. The cast's debut single, a cover of Journey's "Don't Stop Believin'", charted within the top five in many countries and has sold over one million copies in the US. Other high-charting and best-selling singles include the covers of Queen's "Somebody to Love", Neil Diamond's "Sweet Caroline", and "Defying Gravity" from the musical Wicked. Glee Live! In Concert! saw the cast tour the US in promotion of the series' first season and its musical releases. The album earned a nomination for Grammy Award for Best Compilation Soundtrack Album for a Motion Picture, Television or Other Visual Media for the 2011 ceremony.

== Development ==
Glee debuted in America on the Fox network on May 19, 2009. Series creator Ryan Murphy planned to include five to eight musical numbers per episode, and to release accompanying soundtrack albums every few months. In the week prior to the broadcast of the pilot episode, Murphy stated that seven different companies had bid on the rights to the series' first soundtrack. The contenders were narrowed down to four labels, with Fox ultimately signing a deal with Columbia Records as a result of chairman Rob Stringer's belief that Glee would be a success. Stringer appreciated the series' use of both classic and contemporary pop music. He suggested that other record labels underestimated the potential of Glee's musical releases as they are all cover versions.

Murphy was responsible for selecting all of the songs covered on the album, and strove to maintain a balance between show tunes and chart hits. He was surprised at the ease with which use of songs was approved by the record labels approached, and explained, "I think the key to it is they loved the tone of it. They loved that this show was about optimism and young kids, for the most part, reinterpreting their classics for a new audience." Music supervisor P.J. Bloom cleared the song rights with their respective publishers, and music producer Adam Anders rearranged the tracks for the Glee cast. "Take a Bow" was offered for use at a reduced licensing rate, which surprised Murphy, who had believed he would not be able to afford the rights given that it had been a number one hit for Rihanna. Neil Diamond had some reluctance over licensing "Sweet Caroline" to the show, and retracted clearance after it had already been recorded. Bloom was able to convince him to reverse his decision, and Diamond went on to also license his song "Hello Again" for use on the show at a later date.

Stringer did not expect the success of Glee Cast single releases, and estimated that four million copies would be sold by Christmas 2009. He was unsure whether the high sales figures would help or hinder the release of Glee: The Music, Volume 1, and as such, was eager for its release in order to gauge the physical and digital market response. The 17 tracks selected for the album were considered amongst the series' most popular, with Columbia and Fox aiming to attract casual buyers as well as Glee fans. Geoff Bywater, head of Fox's music department, anticipated considerable sales from impulse buyers in retail stores. Instrumental versions of some songs were included as bonus tracks, based on a trend of fans recreating the musical numbers in tribute to the show.

In May 2010, the Glee Cast undertook a US tour entitled Glee Live! In Concert!, performing tracks from the first season's musical releases. From Glee: The Music, Volume 1, "Don't Stop Believin'", "Push It", "Sweet Caroline", "Defying Gravity", "Bust Your Windows" and "Dancing with Myself" were included on the setlist, with "Somebody to Love" as an encore performance.

== Critical reception ==
Professional ratings
Aggregate scores
Source	Rating
Metacritic	60/100
Review scores
Source	Rating
About.com	3/5 stars
allmusic	3.5/5 stars
Billboard	85
The Daily Telegraph	4/5 stars
Entertainment Weekly	(B)
The Guardian	3/5 stars
IGN	8.2/10
The Independent	2/5 stars
Rolling Stone	2.5/5 stars
The Times	2/5 stars

Metacritic gave the album a Metascore—a weighted average based on the impression of eight critical reviews—of 60 percent, signifying "mixed or average reviews". Both Emma Wall of The Daily Telegraph and Christopher John Farley of The Wall Street Journal expressed approval of the choral arrangements, though Wall review observed that some of the ballads lack potency without their episodic context. Farley appreciated the "emotional backstory" given to the album by the television series, writing that it would "evoke fond memories of favorite episodes" for Glee fans. He found the better songs to be the ones which do not seem "too polished", giving them a karaoke appeal. Entertainment Weekly's Leah Greenblatt wrote that the soundtrack is essentially a karaoke album, describing the songs as "unapologetically sincere"—lacking the series' subversive wit, but with "a giddy sort of 'let's put on a show' charm". Billboard's Mikael Wood deemed the most successful tracks those which seem least suited to the series, such as the rock ballads "Don't Stop Believin'" and "Can't Fight This Feeling". Wood commented that "Take a Bow" and "Bust Your Windows" are also enjoyable, but "lack a certain revenge-of-the-nerds triumph."

The Independent's Andy Gill was apathetic towards the album, which he too deemed "karaoke-pop". He praised Riley's rendition of "Bust Your Windows", calling it the album's "most compelling moment", but criticized Morrison's rapping as "the least convincing [...] in recording history." Gill found Agron's cover of "You Keep Me Hanging On" to be "irritatingly anonymous", but otherwise felt the album contained little of note, either positive or negative. Jon Dolan of Rolling Stone shared Gill's sentiments with regards to Morrison's rapping and Riley's "Bust Your Windows", also deeming "Don't Stop Believin'" "a triumphal moment against which resistance is futile." Dan Cairns of The Times described the album as "music of catch-in-the-throat, quick-fix, talent-show emotion" variety, calling it "undeniably effective" but "utterly nauseating."

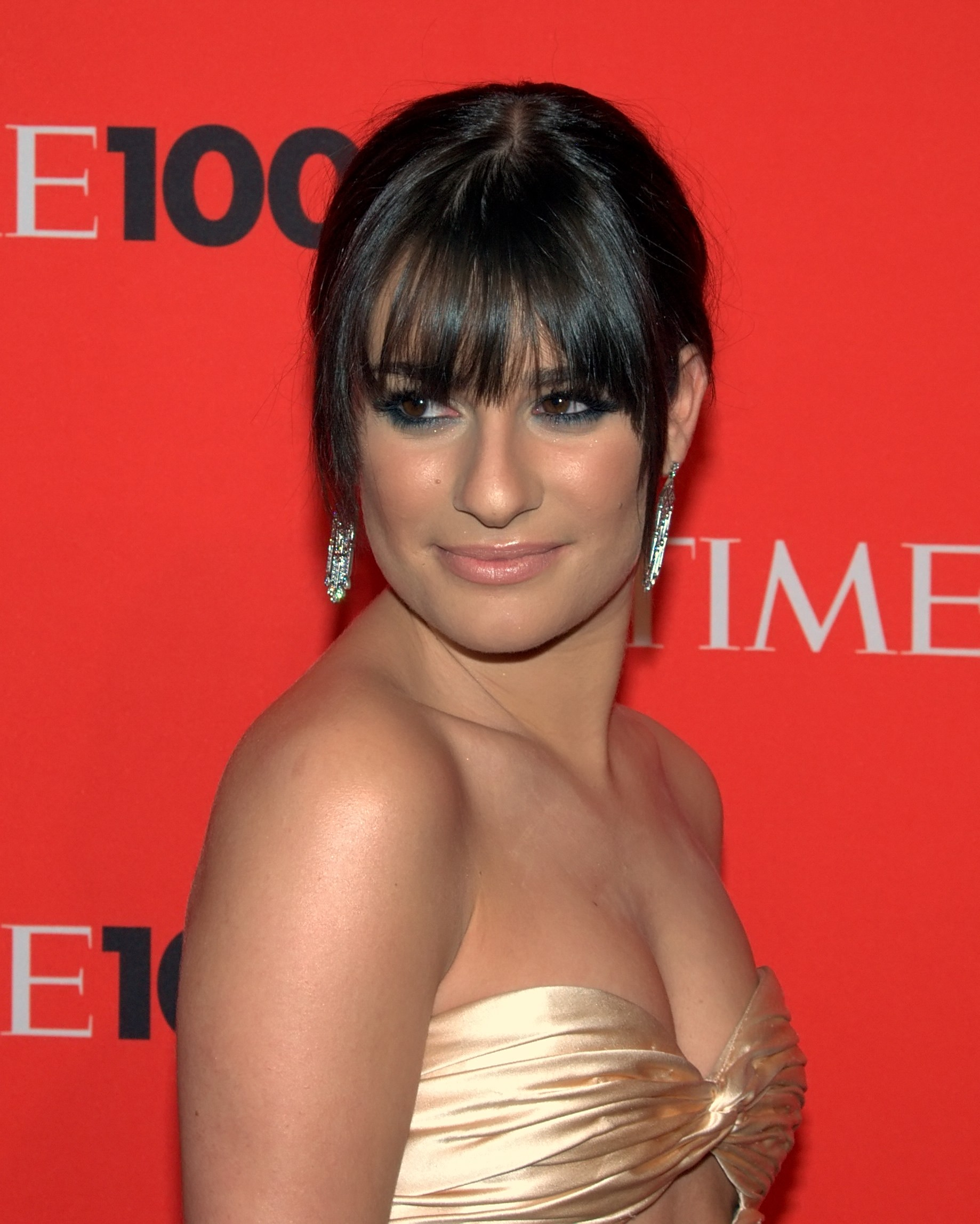
The vocals of Lea Michele (pictured) were generally received positively.

Andrew Leahey of allmusic opined that some of the cast members are better actors than vocalists, but gave particular praise to Michele's songs, suggesting that the soundtrack is largely a showcase for her talent, and that she outperforms most of the original artists. IGN's Brian Linder described the album as having "an appealing irreverent spirit that tamps down the earnestness just as it begins to overwhelm." Linder agreed that Morrison does not excel as an emcee, but still found his attempts at rapping enjoyable. He generally approved of the track list, but found the older songs such as "Sweet Caroline" and "Say a Little Prayer" lacking in resonance, and named "You Keep Me Hangin' On" as the weakest performance. Linder commended Riley and Michele's vocals, and most enjoyed the covers of "Somebody to Love" and "Keep Holding On", suggesting that the latter surpasses the original version. Alexis Petridis of The Guardian commented that the album requires a suspension of disbelief, attributing some negative reviews from US critics to their inability to accept the fantasy of the series. Petridis reviewed "Dancing With Myself", "Sweet Caroline", "Gold Digger", "Somebody to Love" and "Alone" favorably, but as with Gill and Linder disliked "You Keep Me Hangin' On", which she deemed bland and boring. Petridis wrote that the album does not entirely work in its own right, separate from the television series, but concluded that for listeners prepared to accept the conceit, "Glee: the Soundtrack almost lives up to its title."

Glee: The Music, Volume 1 received a nomination in the category of Best Compilation Soundtrack Album for a Motion Picture, Television or Other Visual Media at the 53rd Grammy Awards.

== Commercial performance ==
Glee: The Music, Volume 1 debuted at number four on the Billboard 200, selling 113,000 copies in its first week of release. The same week, the album also debuted at number two on the Billboard Soundtracks chart, going on to reach the top position on May 1, 2010. On September 9, 2010, the album was certified platinum by the Recording Industry Association of America for sales or shipments of 1,000,000 or more. As of May 2011, 1.169 million copies have been sold in the US, and it has remained on the Billboard 200 for seventy-three weeks.

In the United Kingdom, the album entered the top 75 three weeks before its official release, on import sales alone. Following its official release, it debuted at number one with sales of 62,000 according to the Official Charts Company. It was certified platinum for 300,000 copies sold by the British Phonographic Industry on May 21, 2010. In Australia, the album peaked at number three, and was certified platinum for 70,000 copies sold by the Australian Recording Industry Association (ARIA) in 2009, and received a 2× platinum certification from ARIA in 2011. It peaked at number four in Canada, and has been certified platinum with 80,000 units sold by the Canadian Recording Industry Association. The album also peaked at number one in Ireland, eight in New Zealand, nine in the Netherlands, thirty-four in both Austria and Wallonia, thirty-seven in Mexico, forty-eight in Switzerland, sixty-nine in Spain, seventy-four in Flanders, and eighty in Japan.

== Singles ==
Each of the songs included on Glee: The Music, Volume 1, except for the bonus tracks, were released as singles, available for download. The releases made the Glee Cast the tenth cast to have entries chart on the Billboard Hot 100 in its 51-year history. Their debut single "Don't Stop Believin'" charted at number five in Australia, number four in the US and Ireland, and number two in the United Kingdom. In the US, 177,000 copies of the song were sold in its first week of release. Its number four debut surpassed the Journey original, which peaked at number nine in 1981. The original rendition sold 42,000 copies in the week of the Glee Cast release, up 48% on the previous week. "Don't Stop Believin'" was also the cast's best-selling single, and had sold over 1,000,000 copies in the US by October 2010, counting a combination of sales from the original release (921,000) and the rerecording for the season one finale (84,000). It was certified gold by the Recording Industry Association of America on October 13, 2009, and platinum by the Australian Recording Industry Association the following year. By the end of the series, in March 2015, the combined sales of the Glee cast versions of the single had reached 1,422,000 copies in the United States alone.

On October 22, 2010, after the first 26 episodes of the series (season one plus four episodes of season two), Yahoo! Music published a list of the 20 most popular Glee songs, based on download data from Nielsen SoundScan. Of the 20 best-selling singles at that point, eight had been included on Glee: The Music, Volume 1: "Don't Stop Believin'", "Defying Gravity" (335,000 copies), "Somebody to Love" (315,000), "Sweet Caroline" (187,000), "Take a Bow" (181,000), "Keep Holding On" (166,000), "Taking Chances" (163,000), and "Alone" (159,000). On the morning of March 20, 2015, a few hours before the series finale aired, Billboard published a list of the top 10 selling Glee songs. Of the 10 best-selling singles at that point, three had been included on Glee: The Music, Volume 1: "Don't Stop Believin'" (#1, with 1,422,000 copies), "Defying Gravity" (#5, with 529,000) and "Somebody to Love" (#8, with 418,000).

"Take a Bow" charted at number 46 in the US, with 53,000 copies sold in its first week of release. Sales of the original Rihanna version increased by 189 percent after the song was covered in the Glee episode "Showmance". Sales of the Queen version of "Somebody to Love" rose from 2,000 to 6,000 downloads following the release of the Glee Cast cover version.

== Track listing ==
Information based on the album's Liner Notes

No.	Title	Writer(s)	Original artist(s)	Length
1.	"Don't Stop Believin'"	Jonathan Cain, Steve Perry, Neal Schon	Journey	3:50
2.	"Can't Fight This Feeling"	Kevin Cronin	REO Speedwagon	3:29
3.	"Gold Digger"	Kanye West, Ray Charles, Renald Richard	Kanye West feat. Jamie Foxx	3:00
4.	"Take a Bow"	Shaffer Smith, Tor Erik Hermansen, Mikkel Eriksen	Rihanna	3:35
5.	"Bust Your Windows"	Jazmine Sullivan, Salaam Remi, DeAndre Way	Jazmine Sullivan	4:19
6.	"Taking Chances"	Kara DioGuardi, David A. Stewart	Celine Dion	3:55
7.	"Alone" (featuring Kristin Chenoweth)	Billy Steinberg, Tom Kelly	Heart	3:40
8.	"Maybe This Time" (featuring Kristin Chenoweth)	John Kander, Fred Ebb	Liza Minnelli in the film Cabaret	2:57
9.	"Somebody to Love"	Freddie Mercury	Queen	4:43
10.	"Hate On Me"	Jill Scott, Adam Blackstone, Steve McKie	Jill Scott	3:30
11.	"No Air"	Eric "Blue Tooth" Griggs, James Fauntleroy II, Harvey Mason Jr., Damon Thomas, Steve Russell	Jordin Sparks and Chris Brown	4:23
12.	"You Keep Me Hangin' On"	Holland–Dozier–Holland	The Supremes	2:40
13.	"Keep Holding On"	Avril Lavigne, Lukasz Gottwald	Avril Lavigne	4:04
14.	"Bust a Move"	Marvin Young, Jim Walters, Luther Rabb, Matt Dike, Michael Ross	Young MC	4:24
15.	"Sweet Caroline"	Neil Diamond	Neil Diamond	1:58
16.	"Dancing with Myself"	Billy Idol, Tony James	Generation X / Billy Idol	3:10
17.	"Defying Gravity"	Stephen Schwartz	Idina Menzel, Kristin Chenoweth, and the cast of Wicked	2:21

iTunes Store bonus track
No.	Title	Writer(s)	Original artist(s)	Length
18.	"I Say a Little Prayer"	Burt Bacharach, Hal David	Dionne Warwick	1:40

Target bonus tracks
No.	Title	Writer(s)	Original artist(s)	Length
18.	"I Wanna Sex You Up"	Dr. Freeze	Color Me Badd	2:06
19.	"I Could Have Danced All Night"	Frederick Loewe, Alan Jay Lerner	Julie Andrews in the musical My Fair Lady	1:23
20.	"Leaving on a Jet Plane"	John Denver	John Denver	4:03

Wal-Mart/Japanese edition bonus tracks
No.	Title	Writer(s)	Original artist(s)	Length
18.	"Take a Bow" (Glee Cast karaoke version)	Ne-Yo, T.E. Hermansen, M.S. Eriksen	Rihanna	3:35
19.	"Gold Digger" (Glee Cast karaoke version)	West, Charles, Richard	Kanye West feat. Jamie Foxx	3:00
20.	"Somebody to Love" (Glee Cast karaoke version)	Mercury	Queen	4:43

Notes

- ”Gold Digger” contains a sample from “I Got a Woman” written by Ray Charles and Renald Richard.
- ”Bust a Move” contains a sample from “Found a Child" written by Luther Rabb and Jim Walters.

== Personnel ==
- Adam Anders – music & vocal arranger, recording engineer, record producer (All tracks), soundtrack producer, additional background vocals
- Dianna Agron – lead vocals (12; iTunes 18)
- Peer Åström – record producer, recording engineer (1–7, 9–17), audio mixing (All tracks)
- David Bett – art direction, design
- PJ Bloom – music supervisor
- Geoff Bywater – executive in charge of music
- Kristin Chenoweth – lead vocals (7–8)
- Chris Colfer – lead vocals (17)
- Kamari Copeland – additional background vocals
- Tim Davis – vocal arranger, vocal contractor, additional background vocals
- Dante Di Loreto – executive producer
- Lamont Dozier – composer
- Brad Falchuk – executive producer
- Emily Gomez – additional background vocals
- Heather Guibert – coordination
- Nikki Hassman – additional background vocals
- Jeannette Kaczorowski – cover design
- Jenny Karr - additional background vocals
- Robin Koehler – coordination
- James S. Levine – record producer (8)
- David Loucks – additional background vocals
- Meaghan Lyons – coordination
- Chris Mann – additional background vocals
- Dan Marnien – recording engineer (1)
- Maria Paula Marulanda – art direction, design
- Jayma Mays - vocals (credit only)
- Kevin McHale – lead vocals (9, 16)
- Freddie Mercury – composer
- Lea Michele – lead vocals (1, 4, 6, 8–9, 11, 13, 17)
- Cory Monteith – lead vocals (1–2, 9, 11, 13)
- Matthew Morrison – lead vocals (3, 7, 14)
- Ryan Murphy – record producer (All tracks), soundtrack producer
- Ryan Peterson – recording engineer (2–7, 9–17)
- Zac Poor – additional background vocals
- Jasper Randall – additional background vocals
- Amber Riley – lead vocals (5, 9–10)
- Mark Salling – lead vocals (15)
- Louie Teran – mastering
- Jenna Ushkowitz – vocals (credit only)
- Windy Wagner – additional background vocals

== Charts and certifications ==
=== Weekly charts ===
List of 2009 peak positions by chart
Chart (2009)	Peak position	Ref.
Australian Albums Chart	3	
Canadian Albums Chart	4	
Mexican Albums Chart	37	
New Zealand Albums Chart	8	
US Billboard 200	4	

List of 2010 peak positions by chart
Chart (2010)	Peak position	Ref.
Belgian Albums Chart (Wallonia)	34	
Dutch Albums Chart	9	
Irish Albums Chart	1	
Spanish Albums Chart	69	
UK Albums Chart	1	
US Billboard Soundtracks	1	

List of 2011 peak positions by chart
Chart (2011)	Peak position	Ref.
Austrian Albums Chart	34	
Belgian Albums Chart (Flanders)	69	
French Albums Chart	52	
German Album Charts	21	
Italian Compilations Chart	13	
Japanese Albums Chart	80	
Polish Albums Chart	47	
Swiss Albums Chart	48	

=== Year-end charts ===
List of 2009 positions by chart
Chart (2009)	Rank	Ref.
Australian Albums Chart	40	
New Zealand Albums Chart	38	
US Billboard 200	183	

List of 2010 positions by chart
Chart (2010)	Rank	Ref.
Australian Albums Chart	31	
Canadian Albums Chart	27	
Dutch CombiAlbum Chart	89	
Irish Albums Chart	11	
European Top 100 Albums	68	
Mexican Albums Chart	54	
UK Albums Chart	22	
US Billboard 200	23	
US Billboard Soundtracks	2	

List of 2011 positions by chart
Chart (2009)	Rank	Ref.
French Albums Chart	177	
US Billboard Soundtrack	13	

=== Certifications ===
List of sales certifications by country and provider
Country	Provider	Certification (sales thresholds)	Ref.
Australia	ARIA	2× Platinum	
Canada	CRIA	Platinum	
Ireland	IRMA	3× Platinum	
New Zealand	RIANZ	Platinum	
United Kingdom	BPI	Platinum	
United States	RIAA	Platinum	

== Release history ==
List of release dates by country
Country	Release date	Format(s)	Ref.
South Africa	November 2, 2009	Compact disc (CD)	
Canada	November 3, 2009	CD, digital download (DD)	
Netherlands	November 3, 2009	CD, DD	
Mexico	November 3, 2009	CD, DD	
New Zealand	November 3, 2009	CD, DD	
United States	November 3, 2009	CD, DD	
Australia	November 6, 2009	CD, DD	
Belgium	November 6, 2009	CD	
Brazil	November 20, 2009	CD, DD	
Japan	December 15, 2009	CD	
Ireland	January 4, 2010	CD, DD	
Taiwan	January 15, 2010	CD	
United Kingdom	February 15, 2010	CD, DD	
Spain	March 16, 2010	CD, DD	
Italy	January 26, 2011	CD, DD	
