= The Music Band – Jazz =

Studio album by War
- Released: 1983
- Recorded: 1979
- Length: 40:28
- Label: MCA
- Producer: Jerry Goldstein, Lonnie Jordan with Sylvester (Papa Dee) Allen, Howard Scott

War chronology
Outlaw (1982)	The Music Band – Jazz (1983)	Life (Is So Strange) (1983)

The Music Band – Jazz is an album by War, the fifth and final entry in their "Music Band" series, released on MCA Records in 1983. It consists of outtakes from sessions for their 1979 albums The Music Band and The Music Band 2, and features several lineups of the band which existed that year. War were no longer recording for MCA when this album was released, and no singles from the album were issued. Track one was probably recorded/written in 1979 when B. B. Dickerson was still in band and before Charles Miller was murdered. Track two could have been recorded/written anytime up to 1979.

The non-pictorial covers used in the Music Band series continued on this, and the previous volume, The Best of the Music Band (1982) which has a blue cover. Unlike earlier volumes, the last two were not made with elaborate printing methods, but were manufactured using normal four colour printing, without metallic print, embossing, gatefolds or innersleeves.

== Track listing ==
=== Side one ===
1. "Five Spot" (Papa Dee Allen, Harold Brown, B. B. Dickerson, Lonnie Jordan, Charles Miller, Lee Oskar, Howard E. Scott, Pat Rizzo) – 10:09
2. "Half Note" (Allen, Dickerson, Jordan, Miller) – 10:00

=== Side two ===
1. "E.R.A." (Allen, Brown, Ron Hammon, Jordan, Oskar, Luther Rabb, Rizzo, Scott) – 5:24
2. "Koronos" (Allen, Brown, Jordan, Oskar, Rabb, Rizzo, Scott, Jerry Goldstein)
3. "Sometimes I Wonder (Is It for Real) (Allen, Brown, Jordan, Oskar, Rabb, Rizzo, Scott)
4. "A Pattern of Time (Allen, Brown, Jordan, Oskar, Rabb, Rizzo, Scott, Goldstein) – 14:55 (total for tracks 2,3,4)

== Personnel ==
Only the following names are credited on the cover, without listing instruments, which are taken from previous albums.

- Papa Dee Allen – percussion, vocals
- Harold Brown – drums, percussion, vocals
- Ron Hammon – drums, vocals
- Lonnie Jordan – organ, piano, synthesizer, guitar, percussion, vocals
- Lee Oskar – harmonicas, vocals
- Luther Rabb – bass, vocals
- Pat Rizzo – saxophones, vocals
- Howard Scott – guitar, vocals

Not credited, but likely appearing on side one, as they are in the composer credits:

- B. B. Dickerson – bass, vocals
- Charles Miller – flute, saxophones, vocals

Not credited, but appeared in most 1979 lineups, usually without composer credit, therefore possibly appearing on this album:

- Alice Tweed Smith – vocals

=== Technical personnel ===
- Jerry Goldstein and Lonnie Jordon in association with Sylvester (Papa Dee) Allen and Howard Scott – producers
- Chris Huston – recording and remix engineer
- Kevin Gray – mastering
- Leon Tsilis – album coordinator
