= Peace Sign (War album) =

Studio album by War
- Released: 1994
- Length: 78:21 (LP), 75:28 (CD)
- Label: Avenue
- Producer: Jerry Goldstein, Lonnie Jordan

War chronology
Life (is So Strange) (1983)	Peace Sign (1994)	Greatest Hits Live (2008)

☮ is an album by War, released on Avenue Records (distributed by Rhino Records) in 1994. Its title is a graphic of the peace symbol. It is often referred to as Peace Sign, the title of the first track, though arguably it could also be called Peace, the antonym of the group's name. It was released as a CD and also as a double LP, the latter containing an extra track titled "Africa", and a shorter version of "Peace Sign".

This was their first non-compilation album in over a decade, during which time the group had toured sporadically. Most living original members appeared on the album, B.B. Dickerson (bass) being the only exception; but Lee Oskar (harmonica) is not credited as a group member, and only makes a guest appearance on two songs. Another former member Pat Rizzo (saxophone) also makes a guest appearance on the same songs where Oskar appears. Some of the official members of this album's nine-person lineup made somewhat minimal contributions: Ron Hammon is only credited with providing "drum fills" on two songs, while Rae Valentine is mainly credited with "music programming". Only five group members contributed to more than half of the songs, and Lonnie Jordan (keyboards) is the only one who plays on every song (Valentine contributing music programming to all but one). The album carries a dedication to War's deceased members, Papa Dee Allen (congas) and Charles Miller (saxophone).

This album's lineup toured to promote the album, then broke up in 1996 when most of the original members wished to gain independence from producer Jerry Goldstein, who owned the group's name, and created a new group called Lowrider Band. Goldstein then created a new version of War with Lonnie Jordan as the only remaining original member.

A 12-inch single was released with four versions of "Peace Sign". Another track, "I'm the One (Who Understands)", is a re-recording of a song from The Music Band (1979). José Feliciano makes a guest appearance on "East L.A.".

== Track listing ==
=== Side one ===
1. "Peace Sign" (Howard E. Scott, Harold Brown, Milton Myrick) – 4:29
2. "East L.A." (Jerry Goldstein, Scott, Lonnie Jordan) – 5:40
3. "Wild Rodriguez" (Scott, Myrick, Brown, Goldstein) – 4:48
4. "I'm the One (Who Understands)" (Papa Dee Allen, Brown, B.B. Dickerson, Jordan, Charles Miller, Lee Oskar, Scott, Goldstein) – 5:14

=== Side two ===
1. "Da Roof" (Scott, Goldstein, Myrick) – 7:36
2. "The Smuggler (The Light in the Window)" (Goldstein, Brown) – 5:57
3. "U B O.K." (Scott, Brown, Myrick) – 5:31

=== Side three ===
1. "Smile for Me" (S. Ball, E. Baker, Goldstein) – 6:29
2. "Let Me Tell You" (Scott, Myrick, Brown, Goldstein, Jordan) – 5:47
3. "Angel" (Goldstein) – 6:34

=== Side four ===
1. "What If" (Brown, Myrick, Goldstein, Jordan, Scott) – 5:00
2. "Africa" (unknown) – 4:29
3. "Homeless Hero" (H. Scott, J. Scott, Goldstein, Jordan) – 10:47

=== CD edition ===
With the exception of "Peace Sign", differences in timings are trivial and are taken from covers and labels. "Africa" does not appear on the CD edition. See LP listing above for composer credits.

1. "Peace Sign" – 5:57
2. "East L.A." – 5:41
3. "Wild Rodriguez" – 4:49
4. "I'm the One (Who Understands)" – 5:15
5. "Da Roof" – 7:37
6. "The Smuggler (The Light in the Window)" – 5:58
7. "U B O.K." – 5:32
8. "Let Me Tell You" – 5:47
9. "Smile for Me" – 6:30
10. "What If" – 5:01
11. "Angel" – 6:34
12. "Homeless Hero" – 10:47

== Personnel ==
Credits below are missing information for "Africa".

=== Official members ===
- Howard Scott
  - lead vocal on "Peace Sign", "Wild Rodriguez", "I'm the One (Who Understands)", "Da Roof", "U B O.K.", "Let Me Tell You"
  - oratory on "Homeless Hero"
  - guitar on "Peace Sign", "Wild Rodriguez", "I'm the One (Who Understands)", "The Smuggler (The Light in the Window)", "U B O.K.", "Let Me Tell You", "Angel"
  - electric guitar on "East L.A."
  - synth guitar on "Peace Sign"
  - bass guitar on "Wild Rodriguez", "The Smuggler (The Light in the Window)", "U B O.K.", "Let Me Tell You"
  - keyboard samples on "Wild Rodriguez"
  - background vocal on "Peace Sign", "East L.A.", "Wild Rodriguez", "I'm the One (Who Understands)", "Da Roof", "U B O.K.", "Smile for Me", "Let Me Tell You"
- Lonnie Jordan
  - lead vocal on "East L.A.", "The Smuggler (The Light in the Window)", "Smile for Me", "Let Me Tell You", "Angel", "Homeless Hero"
  - keyboards on "Peace Sign", "East L.A.", "Wild Rodriguez", "I'm the One (Who Understands)", "Da Roof", "The Smuggler (The Light in the Window)", "U B O.K.", "Smile for Me", "Let Me Tell You", "Angel", "What If", "Homeless Hero"
  - acoustic piano on "East L.A.", "Angel"
  - synth bass on "Peace Sign", "East L.A.", "I'm the One (Who Understands)", "Da Roof", "Angel", "What If", "Homeless Hero"
  - synth guitar on "Peace Sign", "East L.A.", "Da Roof", "Smile for Me", "Homeless Hero"
  - synth strings (or strings synth) on "East L.A.", "The Smuggler (The Light in the Window)", "Angel"
  - synth horns on "East L.A.", "Let Me Tell You", "What If"
  - organ on "I'm the One (Who Understands)", "Homeless Hero"
  - samples on "The Smuggler (The Light in the Window)"
  - drum programming on "East L.A.", "Da Roof", "Angel"
  - percussion on "Peace Sign", "East L.A.", "Wild Rodriguez", "Da Roof", "U B O.K.", "Angel", "What If", "Homeless Hero"
  - singing bass on "The Smuggler (The Light in the Window)"
  - background vocal on "Peace Sign", "East L.A.", "Wild Rodriguez", "I'm the One (Who Understands)", "Da Roof", "The Smuggler (The Light in the Window)", "U B O.K.", "Smile for Me", "Let Me Tell You", "What If", "Homeless Hero"
  - arrangement on "East L.A."
  - horn arrangement on "What If"
- Ronnie Hammon
  - drum fills on "East L.A.", "Smile for Me"
- Harold Brown
  - lead vocal on "What If"
  - live drums on "Peace Sign", "Wild Rodriguez", "The Smuggler (The Light in the Window)", "U B O.K.", "Let Me Tell You", "What If"
  - percussion on "Peace Sign"
  - samples on "What If"
  - background vocal on "Peace Sign", "Da Roof", "What If"
- Rae Valentine
  - music programmer on "Peace Sign", "East L.A.", "Wild Rodriguez", "I'm the One (Who Understands)", "Da Roof", "The Smuggler (The Light in the Window)", "U B O.K.", "Smile for Me", "Let Me Tell You", "What If", "Homeless Hero"
  - drum programmer on "Wild Rodriguez", "Smile for Me", "Let Me Tell You", "What If"
  - drum fills on "East L.A."
  - percussion on "Smile for Me"
  - organ on "Let Me Tell You"
  - background vocal on "Peace Sign", "I'm the One (Who Understands)", "Da Roof", "U B O.K.", "Smile for Me", "Let Me Tell You", "What If"
- Kerry Campbell
  - saxophone on "Peace Sign", "Wild Rodriguez", "I'm the One (Who Understands)" (solo), "Da Roof", "Smile for Me" (solo), "Let Me Tell You", "What If", "Homeless Hero" (solo)
- Charles Green
  - saxophone on "Peace Sign" (solo), "Wild Rodriguez", "I'm the One (Who Understands)", "Da Roof", "Smile for Me", "Let Me Tell You", "What If", "Homeless Hero"
  - flute on "U B O.K."
  - horn arrangement on "Peace Sign", "Wild Rodriguez", "I'm the One (Who Understands)"
- Tetsuya "Tex" Nakamura
  - harmonica on "Wild Rodriguez", "Da Roof", "The Smuggler (The Light in the Window)", "What If", "Homeless Hero"
- Sal Rodriguez
  - live drums on "I'm the One (Who Understands)"
  - percussion on "I'm the One (Who Understands)", "The Smuggler (The Light in the Window)", "U B O.K."
  - background vocal on "Wild Rodriguez", "I'm the One (Who Understands)"

=== Other musicians, arrangers, programmers ===
- Elsa Barrera
  - Spanish speaking voice on "U B O.K."
- José Feliciano
  - lead vocal on "East L.A."
  - acoustic guitar on "East L.A."
- Larry Goetz
  - guitar on "Homeless Hero"
- Jerry Goldstein
  - percussion on "East L.A."
  - background vocal on "Da Roof"
  - arrangement on "East L.A."
  - horn arrangement on "Peace Sign", "I'm the One (Who Understands)", "What If"
- Ricky Green
  - background vocal on "Smile for Me"
- Matt Hyde
  - music programmer on "East L.A.", "Da Roof", "Smile for Me", "Angel", "Homeless Hero"
  - drum programmer on "Homeless Hero"
- Gerry Kenebrew
  - music programmer on "Smile for Me"
- Milton Myrick
  - background vocal on "Peace Sign", "Wild Rodriguez", "I'm the One (Who Understands)", "Da Roof", "U B O.K.", "Let Me Tell You", "What If"
- Lee Oskar
  - harmonica on "Smile for Me", "Angel"
- Gene Page
  - synth strings on "Smile for Me"
  - strings arrangement on "East L.A.", "Smile for Me"
- Pat Rizzo
  - saxophone on "Smile for Me", "Angel" (solo)
- The Waters
  - background vocals on "East L.A.", "Angel"
- Moses Wheelock
  - congas on "Peace Sign", "U B O.K.", "What If"
  - background vocal on "Da Roof", "What If"
- Romeo Williams
  - bass on "Smile for Me"

=== Technical personnel ===
- Jerry Goldstein and Lonnie Jordon – producers
  - Jerry Goldstein, Lonnie Jordon and Howard Scott – producers on "Peace Sign"
- Larry Goetz – engineer, mix engineer
  - Richard Kaplan, Andrew Berliner, Matt Hyde – additional engineers on "Smile for Me"
- David Gleason, Craig Silvey, Dan Alonso, John Jackson, Jim Schwarz, Andy Uduff, Andrew Berliner, Matt Hyde – assistant engineers
- Eric Greedy – assistant engineer, assistant mix engineer
- Dave Collins – mastering
- Glenn Stone – cover design concept
- Aaron Brashear – cover design concept, cover and label design
- Art Hotel – additional design
- Jeffrey Mayer – photography
- Frank Rand, Abbey Anna – project coordination
- Mic Holwin – text editor
