= Hal DeWindt =

Producer, director, actor and model

- Born: Harold DeWindt; New York City, U.S.
- Died: June 16, 1997; Los Angeles, California, U.S.
- Occupations: Producer; director; actor; model
- Years active: 1959–1997

Harold "Hal" DeWindt was an American producer, director, actor, and model. He worked to increase opportunities for African Americans in the arts.

== Early life ==
DeWindt was born and raised in Harlem. His father Clifford acted with the original Lafayette Theatre.

== Career ==
In 1959, DeWindt became the first male model for the Ebony Fashion Fair. He traveled with that fashion troupe for two years.

DeWindt began his stage career in the Broadway play Golden Boy. He played a leading role in the Louis S. Peterson play Entertain A Ghost. He also appeared in the Kurt Weill musical Lost in the Stars. In 1962, DeWindt staged an Off-Broadway production of Raisin' Hell in the Son, a spoof of A Raisin in the Sun that he co-wrote with Reni Santoni.

DeWindt served as production stage manager at the New York Shakespeare Festival for seven years. He was a director with Robert Hooks's Group Theater Workshop, which led to the creation of the Negro Ensemble Company, which he served with as a workshop director.

DeWindt was the founder and artistic director of the American Theatre of Harlem, and artistic director of the Inner City Repertory Company in Los Angeles. In 1977, he formed the Hal DeWindt Theatre in San Francisco.

DeWindt helped Arthur Mitchell bring the Dance Theatre of Harlem to Broadway, and helped Leonard Bernstein bring black musicians into the New York Philharmonic. In 1969, as assistant producer of The Angel Levine, DeWindt helped run a black apprenticeship program funded by a Ford Foundation grant. He also worked on a number of other film and television productions, and led acting workshops. DeWindt acted on television as well.

In 1983, DeWindt co-authored the book Kill, Bubba, Kill! with former NFL player and actor Bubba Smith. DeWindt was serving as an acting professor at Loyola Marymount University at the time of his death.

== Personal life and death ==
In 1958, DeWindt and his wife Violet had their first child, Hal D. Jr. In 1975, DeWindt met actress Sheila Wills when she enrolled in an actor's workshop he was teaching in Los Angeles. They married two years later. The couple divorced in 1981. In 1984, DeWindt married actress/model Angelique. He later married another woman, Suzanne.

DeWindt died of cancer in Los Angeles on June 22, 1997. The New York Times reported his age at death as 63.

== Filmography (selected) ==
Year	Title	Role	Notes
1978	Youngblood		Associate producer
1978	A Hero Ain't Nothin' But a Sandwich		Associate producer
1975	Barbary Coast		Director
1970	The Angel Levine		Assistant producer
1968	Get Smart	Novak	Episode: The Worst Best Man
1968	The Wild Wild West	Taro	Episode: The Night of the Undead
