= Youngblood (soundtrack) =

Youngblood (Original Motion Picture Soundtrack)

Soundtrack album by War
- Released: 1978
- Studio: Cherokee, ABC, Sound City, Beachwood
- Length: 48:02
- Label: United Artists
- Producer: Jerry Goldstein, Lonnie Jordan, Howard Scott

War chronology
Galaxy (1977)	Youngblood (Original Motion Picture Soundtrack) (1978)	The Music Band (1979)

Youngblood (Original Motion Picture Soundtrack) is an album by the American band War, released in 1978. It is the soundtrack to the film of the same name.

The album peaked at No. 69 on the Billboard 200. The title track peaked at No. 21 on Billboard's Best Selling Soul Singles chart.

== Production ==
The album was produced primarily by Jerry Goldstein. It was War's final album with B.B. Dickerson as a full member of the band; discounting Eric Burdon, it was also the band's final album with its original lineup. War and the film's studio used a multi-track synchronizing system, as did many soundtracks of the period. "Youngblood (Livin' in the Streets)" begins with a conga introduction.

== Critical reception ==
Professional ratings
Review scores
Source	Rating
AllMusic	2/5 stars
Robert Christgau	C+
The Encyclopedia of Popular Music	3/5 stars
The New Rolling Stone Record Guide	3/5 stars
Martin C. Strong	4/10

Robert Christgau wrote that "the level of the writing is suggested by the title of the best track, 'This Funky Music Makes You Feel Good'."

AllMusic said that "War got decent mileage from the soundtrack for this B-movie... They ended with two R&B hits." The New Rolling Stone Record Guide determined that the soundtrack was among the United Artists albums "of uniformly high quality, stinging and angry at their peaks."

== Track listing ==
No.	Title	Length
1.	"Youngblood (Livin' in the Streets)"	10:42
2.	"Sing a Happy Song"	4:04
3.	"Keep On Doin'"	3:50
4.	"The Kingsmen Sign"	2:35
5.	"Walking to War"	2:43
6.	"This Funky Music Makes You Feel Good"	6:26
7.	"Junk Yard"	2:32
8.	"Superdude"	2:35
9.	"Youngblood & Sybil"	1:44
10.	"Flying Machine (The Chase)"	7:39
11.	"Searching for Youngblood & Rommel"	1:45
12.	"Youngblood (Livin' in the Streets) Reprise"	1:27
