= Ballin' Jack =

US musical group

- Origin: Seattle, Washington, United States
- Genres: Rock, Funk rock
- Years active: 1969–1974
- Label: Columbia Records
- Past members: Ronnie Hammon; Luther Rabb; Jim Coile; Tim McFarland; Billy McPherson, Glenn Thomas; Jim Walters, King Errisson

Ballin' Jack (stylised as Ballin'jack) was an American horn rock group formed in Seattle, Washington in 1969 by Luther Rabb (bass and vocals) and Ronnie Hammon (drums). They had a minor hit in 1970 with "Super Highway", which hit #93 on the Billboard Top 100.

== Career ==
Rabb and Hammon were inspired by the success of their childhood friend Jimi Hendrix. They added Glenn Thomas on guitar, and on the horns, Jim Coile and Tim McFarland. They moved to Los Angeles, California, and lived in a mansion home-studio near the Sunset Strip. Hendrix asked the group to come along with him on his 1970 "Cry Of Love" tour.

From 1969 to 1974 Ballin' Jack headlined up and down the West Coast. They went on nationwide US tours warming up for many of the bands at venues like the Fillmore East and West. They were on the bill of several large music festivals of the era. When they played the Troubadour in Los Angeles in 1972, Billy Joel was the opening act. Ballin' Jack also played in Japan, where they were well received.

By 1975, the band had decided to break up. Luther Rabb later toured with Santana, and both he and Ronnie Hammon later joined War.

Jim Coile (born January 22, 1948, in Kirkland, Washington) died tragically on June 20, 2019, at age 71.

== Legacy ==
Their song "Found a Child" from their first album was featured on the Columbia Records sampler album Together!.

Several of their songs have been covered or sampled by other artists, including:

- "Found a Child" – prominently sampled on the Grammy-winning 1989 rap hit "Bust a Move" by Young MC.
- "Found a Child" – covered by Funktuation on their EP "Talk" in 2005.
- "Found a Child" – covered by Cane And Able on their album "Cane And Able" in 1972.
- "Never Let 'Em Say" – sampled by The Beastie Boys in the rap song "Shadrach", from the 1989 album, Paul's Boutique.
- "Never Let 'Em Say" – sampled on the 1991 song "Step in the Arena" by Gang Starr
- "Never Let 'em Say" – sampled by Double X Posse in their hit 1992 single "Not Gonna Be Able To Do It"

== Personnel ==
- Luther Rabb (bass, vocals) (1942–2006)
- Ronnie Hammon (drums)
- Glenn Thomas (guitar, mandolin)
- Jim Coile (sax, flute, clarinet) (died 2019)
- Tim McFarland (trombone, piano, backing vocals (Sep. 20, 1945 – May 26, 2011)
- Jim Walters (trumpet, flugelhorn, vocals) (deceased)
- Billy McPherson (sax) (- Nov. 19, 2011)
- King Errison (percussion, keyboards)

== Discography ==
=== Albums ===
- Ballin' Jack (Columbia, 1970, C 30344) The album peaked at No. 180 on the Billboard Top LPs during an eight-week stay on the chart.
- Buzzard Luck (Columbia, 1972, KC 31468)
- Special Pride (Mercury, 1973, SRM 1–672)
- Live And In Color (Mercury, 1974, SRM-1-700)

=== Singles ===
- 1970 Found A Child / Never Let 'Em Say (Columbia, 4-45348)
- 1970 Super Highway / Only a Tear (Columbia 4-45312) (#93, Billboard, #102 Cash Box)
- 1970 Hold On / Ballin' The Jack (Columbia, 4-45464)
- 1972 (Come 'Round Here) I'm the One You Need / Playin' The Game (Columbia, 4-45698)
- 1973 Try To Relax / Thunder (Mercury, 73401)
- 1973 This Song / Sunday Morning (Mercury, 73429-Promo)
