= Sheila Wills =

American actress (born 1947)

- Wills in 1988
- Born: August 11, 1947 (age 79); Louisiana
- Other name: Sheila DeWindt
- Education: Occidental College
- Occupation: Actress
- Years active: 1975–present
- Notable credit(s): Role as Angie on NBC-TV series B. J. and the Bear, numerous TV series guest or recurring appearances
- Spouse: Hal DeWindt (1977-1981)
- Partner: Philip Michael Thomas (1982-?)
- Children: Melody Thomas; India Thomas
- Relatives: Deborah Lacey (sister)

Sheila Wills (born August 11, 1947) is an American actress, also known as Sheila DeWindt. She is known for her regular role on the television series B. J. and the Bear, and recurring roles on series including Days of Our Lives, Battlestar Galactica, and Generations.

== Early life and education ==
Wills was born in Louisiana and raised in Los Angeles, California. She started working at a young age, stating in 1982, "I've had a job since I was 11 - it might have been waiting tables or cleaning houses... but it helped me attain a goal". Wills graduated from Occidental College, where she later became an assistant dean of admissions. She had always wanted to be an actress, and quit her job in education shortly after attending an actor's workshop in Los Angeles in 1975.

== Career ==
Before landing the role of Angie on B.J. and the Bear, Wills made guest appearances on a number of television series, including Baretta, Kojak, Quincy, and The Six Million Dollar Man. Later television appearances included McClain's Law, The Jeffersons, and The A-Team. Wills has also modeled and appeared in commercials and films, including Goldengirl, Youngblood, and The Concorde... Airport '79.

== Personal life ==
The actor's workshop Wills attended in 1975 was run by producer/director/actor Hal DeWindt. Wills and DeWindt married two years later. The couple divorced in 1981, and the actress returned to using the name Wills some years later. Following her divorce, Wills had a relationship with actor Philip Michael Thomas. Wills and Thomas had two children together, Melody and India.

== Filmography (selected) ==
=== Film ===
Year	Title	Role	Notes
1979	The Concorde... Airport '79	Young Girl	
1979	Goldengirl	Debbie	
1978	Youngblood	Joan	
1978	A Hero Ain't Nothin' But a Sandwich	Admissions Clerk	

=== Television ===
Year	Title	Role	Notes
2022	NCIS: Los Angeles	Thelma	One episode
2022–present	All American	Ms. Maritta	Two episodes
2003	Scrubs	Wife	Episode: My Friend the Doctor
1997	7th Heaven	Teacher	Episode: Dangerous Liaisons: Part 2
1996	Sweet Temptation	Lawyer	TV movie
1995	Beverly Hills, 90210	Professor Helen Kincaid	Episode: Breast Side Up
1995	Tyson	Ruth Roper	TV movie
1994	Jack Reed: A Search for Justice	Mary Alice	TV movie
1994	I Spy Returns	Lily Scott	TV movie
1992	Swamp Thing	Daphne Scott	Episode: Dead and Married
1990	Shannon's Deal	Liz Washington	Episode: Custody
1989	Knots Landing	Ticket Taker	Episode: Road Trip
1989	Hunter	Donna Carlisle	Episode: Teen Dreams
1989	Generations	Rita Barton	
1988	Cagney & Lacey	Stacey	Episode: "Amends"
1988	The Bold and the Beautiful	Beverly Murdock	Three episodes
1986	The A-Team	Deborah Duke	Episode: The Duke of Whispering Pines
1985	Stir Crazy	Angela	Episode: The Ping Pong Caper
1984	Webster	Ms. Oliver	Episode: Dreamland
1983–1984	Days of Our Lives	Joan Hopkins	Two episodes
1983	The Powers of Matthew Star	Kerry	Episode: Brain Drain
1982	The Jeffersons	Dede Sanderson	Episode: Appointment in 8-B
1982	The New Odd Couple		Episode: That Was No Lady
1981	McClain's Law		Episode: A Time of Peril
1981	B. J. and the Bear	Angie	Fifteen episodes
1980	Galactica 1980	Stewardess	Episode: The Night the Cylons Landed: Part 1
1980	Quincy, M.E.	Katya Hester	Episode: T.K.O.
1979	Buck Rogers in the 25th Century	Major Fields	Episode: Planet of the Slave Girls
1978	Battlestar Galactica	Lieutenant Deitra	Two episodes
1978	Switch	Cleo Johnson	Episode: Photo Finish
1978	Baretta	Minnie	Episode: The Bundle
1977	Kojak	Leilah	Episode: The Summer of '69: Part 1
1976–1977	The Six Million Dollar Man	Rhonda/Saleslady	Two episodes
1975	Marcus Welby, M.D.	Clerk	Episode: The Medea Factor
