= Marcos J. Reyes =

American musician (born 1960)

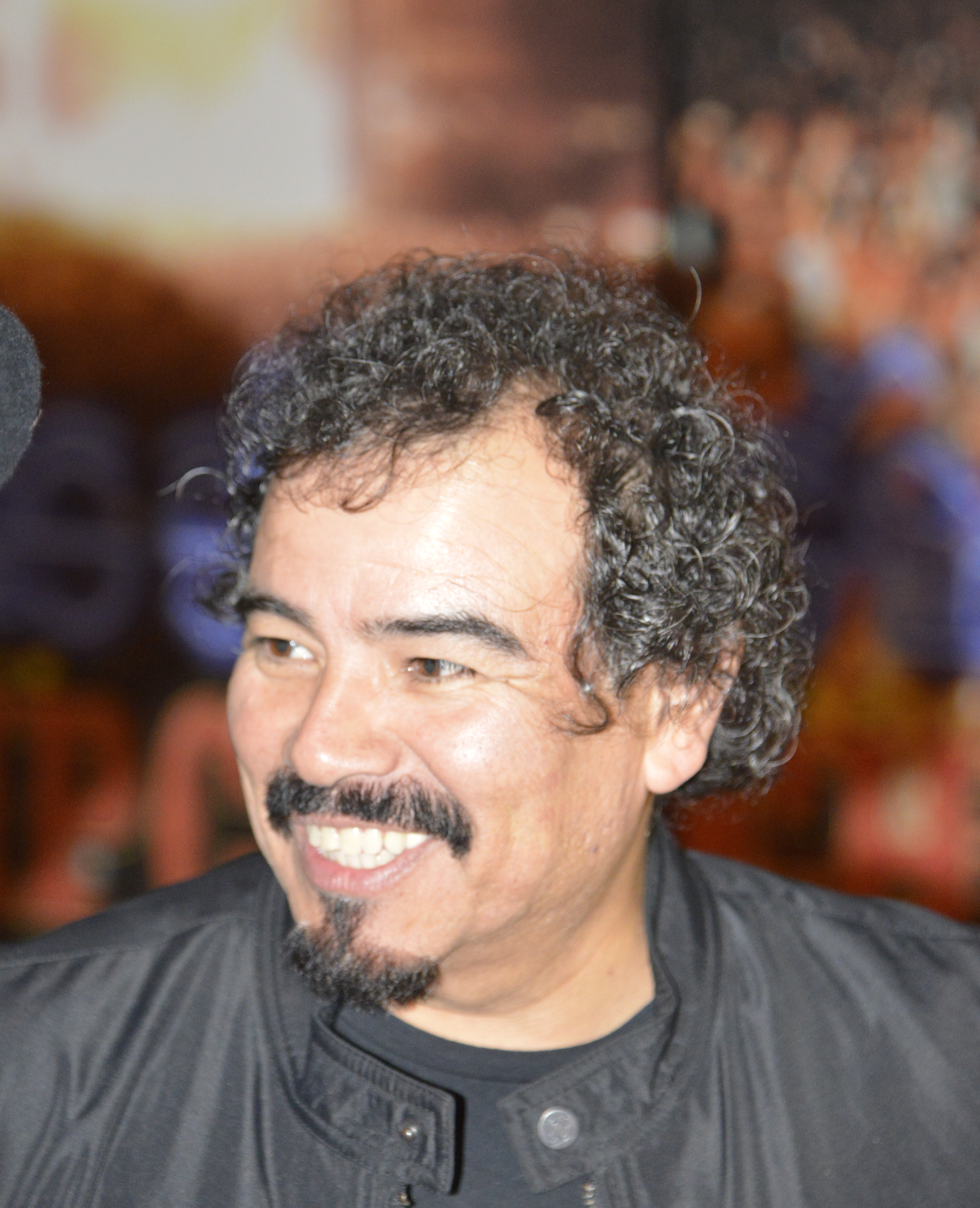

Marcos J. Reyes (born 1960) has been the Latin percussionist for the American progressive soul band War since 1998.

== Early life ==
Reyes was born to parents from Chihuahua, Mexico. He is native of Lamont, California.

== Career ==
Beginning by practicing on his brother's congas, Reyes taught himself by imitating what he heard on albums. He studied the art of Afro-Cuban drumming by studying with the National Folidoric group of Cuba and Los Angeles percussionist, Luis Conte. Reyes joined War in 1998 and has been the Latin percussionist in the band since that time.

Reyes has performed with Latin rock and performers such as Los Lobos, El Chicano, Malo, Tierra, Mento Buru, Abel Sanchez and Jorge Santana, as well as sharing the stage with Latin Jazz artists, Tito Puente, Dizzy Gillespie, Poncho Sanchez and Pete Escovedo. When War is not on tour, Reyes also works as a session musician. Outside of studio work, he teaches percussion privately, conducts percussion clinics for schools and music stores and leads his own band, Salsiology.

Reyes owns and operates a hair salon.

== Personal life ==
Reyes currently resides in Bakersfield, California.
