= The Music Band 2 =

Studio album by War
- Released: 1979
- Genre: Jazz-funk
- Length: 45:34
- Label: MCA
- Producer: Jerry Goldstein, Lonnie Jordan, Howard Scott

War chronology
| The Music Band (1979) | The Music Band 2 (1979) | The Music Band Live (1980) |

Professional ratings
Review scores
| Source | Rating |
|---|---|
| AllMusic | 1.5/5 stars |

The Music Band 2 is an album by the American band War, released on MCA Records in 1979. It peaked at No. 111 on the Billboard 200.

War had more personnel changes since the previous album in the series, earlier in 1979. Charles Miller (saxophone) left after recording one song, replaced by Pat Rizzo (ex Sly and the Family Stone) who is credited with playing "horns". The following year, Miller became the victim of an unsolved murder. Another new member was Ron Hammon on drums; the group now had three drummers, the others being Harold Brown and Papa Dee Allen (on congas). Alice Tweed Smith, who was credited as Tweed Smith on the previous album, is Alice Tweed Smyth on this one; she is included in the composer credits for the first time (with spelling of Smith), but only on one track. The album was produced by Jerry Goldstein, Lonnie Jordan, and Howard Scott. Songwriter credits can be used to determine who played on which tracks (producer Jerry Goldstein is often credited as well), although Smith may be singing background vocals on tracks for which she is not credited, Rizzo and Luther Rabb are not included in the credits for one song (and possibly doesn't play on it), and one track is a new version of an old song with its original songwriting credits. The song "I'll take care of you" is used in film Youngblood as an instrumental and isn't on the soundtrack.

The cover was printed using elaborate methods as used on the previous album in the series: a background painted solid green (instead of using a four-colour printing press), with metallic gold print (plus black print on the back), and embossing. An inner sleeve has colour photos of the group, two from the same photo shoot session, each with eight of nine group members: Papa Dee Allen is absent from one, and Alice Tweed Smith from the other. As was the case in the previous album, the back cover shows songs in a different order from their actual appearance. The plain but elaborate cover art concept continued with the next album in the series, The Music Band Live (1980) which has a black cover.

Two singles were issued from the album: "Don't Take It Away" in 1979, and "I'll Be Around" in 1980. Both have the same B-side, "The Music Band 2 (We are the Music Band)".

== Track listing ==
Side one

1. "Don't Take It Away" (Papa Dee Allen, Harold Brown, Jerry Goldstein, Ron Hammon, Lonnie Jordan, Lee Oskar, Luther Rabb, Pat Rizzo, Howard E. Scott, Alice Tweed Smith) – 6:45
2. "I'll Be Around" (Allen, Brown, Hammon, Jordan, Oskar, Rabb, Rizzo, Scott) – 6:34
3. "I'll Take Care of You" (Allen, Brown, Jordan, Charles Miller, Oskar, Scott) – 8:48

Side two

1. "Night People" (Allen, Brown, Goldstein, Hammon, Jordan, Oskar, Rabb, Rizzo, Scott) – 6:30
2. "The World Is a Ghetto (special all new instrumental version)" (Allen, Brown, B.B. Dickerson, Jordan, Miller, Oskar, Scott) – 13:47
3. "The Music Band 2 (We Are the Music Band)" (Allen, Brown, Hammon, Jordan, Oskar, Rabb, Rizzo, Scott) – 3:10

== Personnel ==
War

- Papa Dee Allen – percussion, vocals
- Harold Brown – drums, percussion, vocals
- Ron Hammon – drums, vocals
- Lonnie Jordan – organ, piano, synthesizer, guitar, percussion, vocals
- Lee Oskar – harmonicas, vocals
- Luther Rabb – bass, vocals
- Pat Rizzo – horns, vocals
- Howard Scott – guitar, vocals
- Alice Tweed Smyth – percussion, vocals
- Charles Miller – saxophone on "I'll Take Care of You"

Technical personnel

- Jerry Goldstein, Lonnie Jordon, Howard Scott – producers
- Chris Huston – recording and remix engineer
- Jeff Eccles, Russell Schmitt, Doug Pakes, Don Smith – second engineers
- Wally Traugett – mastering
- Richard Gibbs – synthesizer programs
- George Osaki, Lee Oskar – art direction
- Alan Bergman – photography
