= Youngblood (1978 film) =

1978 film by Noel Nosseck

- Directed by: Noel Nosseck
- Written by: Paul Carter Harrison
- Produced by: Nick Grillo; Alan Riche
- Starring: Lawrence Hilton-Jacobs; Bryan O'Dell; Ren Woods
- Cinematography: Robbie Greenberg
- Edited by: Frank Morriss
- Music by: War
- Distributed by: American International Pictures
- Release date: May 24, 1978
- Running time: 104 minutes
- Country: United States
- Language: English
- Box office: $1 million

Youngblood is a 1978 American film directed by Noel Nosseck. It stars Lawrence Hilton-Jacobs and features Bryan O'Dell in the title role Michael "Youngblood" Gordon. Ren Woods has a prominent supporting role. It was released by American International Pictures. The soundtrack to the film was written and performed by War.

== Plot ==
Michael Gordon Jr. is an African-American teenager in South-Central Los Angeles, being raised by a single mother and beginning to drift away from school. Before long, Michael is running with a tough local street gang, the Kingsmen, who christen him with the nickname Youngblood. Michael greatly looks up to the gang's leader, Rommel, an angry Vietnam War veteran who is beginning to accept the fact that he's getting to be too old to be involved in the street gang lifestyle.

Shortly after Michael joins the Kingsmen, they move from merely battling other similar street gangs to becoming involved in a full-scale war against a local cartel of drug dealers. Unknown to Michael and the Kingsmen, the head of the organization is Michael's own older brother Reggie.

== Cast ==
- Lawrence Hilton-Jacobs as Rommel
- Bryan O'Dell as Michael Gordon Jr /(Youngblood)
- Ren Woods as Sybil
- Art Evans as Junkie
- Sheila Wills as Joan
- Ralph Farquhar as Geronimo
- Isabel Cooley as School Principal

== Soundtrack ==
Youngblood (Original Motion Picture Soundtrack)

Soundtrack album by War
- Released: 1978
- Recorded: 1978
- Genre: Funk
- Length: 45:12
- Labels: United Artists; UA-LA904-H
- Producer: Jerry Goldstein

War chronology
Galaxy (1977)	Youngblood (Original Motion Picture Soundtrack) (1978)	The Music Band (1979)

Track listing:

1. "Youngblood (Livin' In The Streets)"
2. "Sing A Happy Song"
3. "Keep On Doin'"
4. "The Kingsmen Sign"
5. "Walking To War"
6. "This Funky Music Makes You Feel Good"
7. "Junk Yard"
8. "Superdude"
9. "Youngblood & Sybil"
10. "Flyin' Machine (The Chase)"
11. "Searching For Youngblood & Rommel"
12. "Youngblood (Livin' In The Streets) Reprise"

== See also ==
- List of blaxploitation films
- List of hood films
