= Outlaw (War album) =

Studio album by War
- Released: 1982
- Genre: R&B; funk
- Length: 40:37
- Label: RCA Victor
- Producer: Jerry Goldstein; Lonnie Jordan

War chronology
| The Music Band Live (1980) | Outlaw (1982) | The Music Band – Jazz (1983) |

Outlaw is an album by the American band War, released in 1982. The band supported the album with a North American tour. "Cinco de Mayo" became a popular seasonal standard.

This was War's first album for RCA. Between this and the previous album on MCA, War released a single on LA Records, a company owned by their producer Jerry Goldstein: "Cinco de Mayo", which also appears on Outlaw, backed with "Don't Let No One Get You Down", an older track from Why Can't We Be Friends? (1975).

Alice Tweed Smith (vocals) had left the band since their previous album, reducing the group to eight members, although the cover only shows seven. Pat Rizzo isn't on the cover picture.

Three more singles from the album were issued on RCA Victor: "You Got the Power" backed with "Cinco de Mayo", "Outlaw" backed with "I'm About Somebody", and "Just Because" backed with "The Jungle (medley)". Also, "Baby It's Cold Outside" (not the popular 1940s song by Frank Loesser) was issued as a promotional single for seasonal music radio programming.

The album was re-released on CD in 1995 with a different running order and the extended version of "Cinco de Mayo" added as a bonus track.

== Critical reception ==
Professional ratings
Review scores
| Source | Rating |
|---|---|
| AllMusic | 3/5 stars |
| Robert Christgau | B |

Robert Christgau noted that "the pan-Afro-American groove is sharper and the tempos often approach medium fast, but the music sounds almost vintage anyway."

AllMusic wrote that the album "became a triumphant trumpet, a heralding battle cry—War was returning to form."

== Charts ==
=== Singles ===
| Year | Single | Chart positions, | | |
| Year | Single | US | US R&B | US Dance |
|---|---|---|---|---|
| 1982 | "Cinco de Mayo" | | 90 | — |
| 1982 | "You Got the Power" | 66 | 18 | 6 |
| 1982 | "Outlaw" | 94 | 13 | — |

== Track listing ==
Side one

1. "You Got the Power" (Allen, Brown, Goldstein, Jordan, Oskar, Rabb, Scott) – 5:41
2. "Outlaw" (Allen, Brown, Goldstein, Hammon, Jordan, Oskar, Rabb, Scott) – 5:02
3. "The Jungle (Medley)" (Allen, Brown, Goldstein, Hammon, Jordan, Oskar, Rabb, Scott) - 8:06
  1. "Beware It's a Jungle Out There" – 2:30
  2. "The Street of Walls" – 1:37
  3. "The Street of Lights" – 1:59
  4. "The Street of Now" – 2:40

Side two

1. "Just Because" (Papa Dee Allen, Harold Brown, Ron Hammon, Lonnie Jordan, Lee Oskar, Luther Rabb, Howard E. Scott) – 4:09
2. "Baby It's Cold Outside" (Allen, Brown, Hammon, Jordan, Oskar, Rabb, Pat Rizzo, Scott, Jerry Goldstein) – 5:51
3. "I'm About Somebody" (Allen, Brown, Goldstein, Jordan, Oskar, Rabb, Scott) – 5:34
4. "Cinco de Mayo" (Allen, Brown, Goldstein, Hammon, Jordan, Oskar, Rabb, Rizzo, Scott) – 3:59

== 1995 CD re-release ==
1. "Cinco de Mayo" (Allen, Brown, Goldstein, Hammon, Jordan, Oskar, Rabb, Rizzo, Scott) – 3:59
2. "Outlaw" (Allen, Brown, Goldstein, Hammon, Jordan, Oskar, Rabb, Scott) – 5:02
3. "The Jungle (Medley)" (Allen, Brown, Goldstein, Hammon, Jordan, Oskar, Rabb, Scott) – 8:06
4. "Just Because" (Papa Dee Allen, Harold Brown, Ron Hammon, Lonnie Jordan, Lee Oskar, Luther Rabb, Howard E. Scott) – 4:09
5. "Baby It's Cold Outside" (Allen, Brown, Hammon, Jordan, Oskar, Rabb, Pat Rizzo, Scott, Jerry Goldstein) – 5:51
6. "I'm About Somebody" (Allen, Brown, Goldstein, Jordan, Oskar, Rabb, Scott) – 5:34
7. "You Got the Power" (Allen, Brown, Goldstein, Jordan, Oskar, Rabb, Scott) – 5:41
8. "Cinco de Mayo" (Extended Version) (Allen, Brown, Goldstein, Hammon, Jordan, Oskar, Rabb, Rizzo, Scott) – 7:30

== Personnel ==
War

- Papa Dee Allen – percussion, lead and background vocals
- Harold Brown – drums, percussion, background vocals
- Ron Hammon – drums, percussion, background vocals
- Lonnie Jordan – organ, piano, synthesizer, percussion, lead and background vocals
- Lee Oskar – harmonicas
- Luther Rabb – bass, lead and background vocals
- Pat Rizzo – saxophones, flutes
- Howard Scott – guitar, lead and background vocals

Technical personnel

- Jerry Goldstein and Lonnie Jordon – producers
- Chris Huston, John Fischbach – recording engineers
- Bill Ravencraft – second engineer
- Jef Sanders – mastering engineer
- Tony King – cover concept
- Mike Doud – art direction, design
- Richard Arrindell – photography
