= Barbary Coast (TV series) =

- Genre: Western/Spy-fi
- Created by: Douglas Heyes
- Written by: Howard Beck; Michael Philip Butler; Cy Chermak; James Doherty; William D. Gordon; Douglas Heyes; Harold Livingston; Stephen Lord
- Directed by: Hal DeWindt; Alexander Grasshoff; Don McDougall; Herb Wallerstein; Don Weis
- Starring: William Shatner; Dennis Cole; Doug McClure
- Composer: John Andrew Tartaglia
- Country of origin: United States
- Original language: English
- No. of seasons: 1
- No. of episodes: 13

Production
- Executive producer: Cy Chermak
- Producer: Douglas Heyes
- Cinematography: Robert B. Hauser
- Editors: James Doherty; William D. Gordon
- Running time: 45 mins.
- Production companies: Francy Productions; Paramount Network Television

Original release
- Network: ABC
- Release: May 4, 1975 – January 9, 1976

Barbary Coast is an American television series that aired on ABC. The pilot film first aired on May 4, 1975, and the series itself premiered September 8, 1975; the last episode aired January 9, 1976.

== Synopsis ==
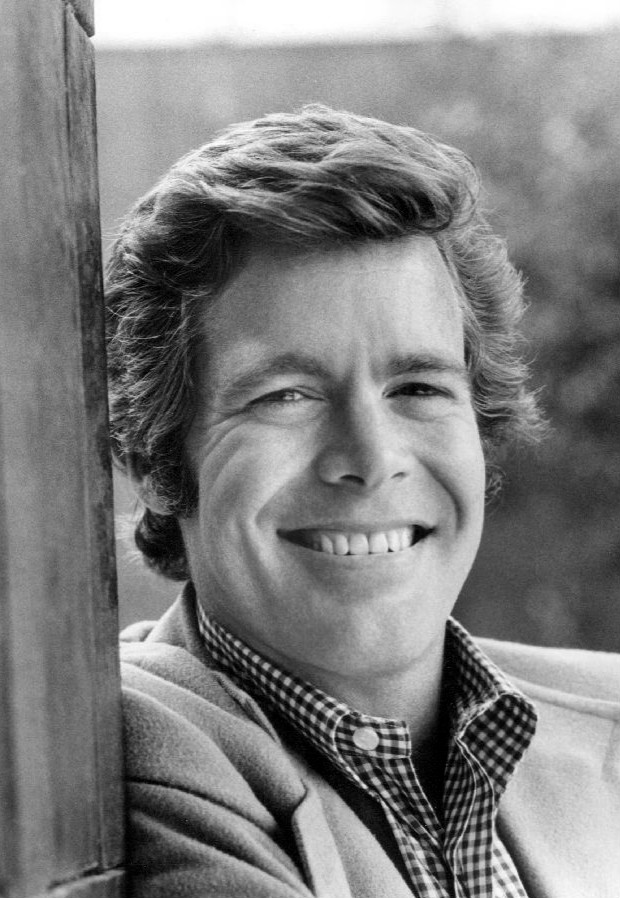
Doug McClure in Barbary Coast

With an 1870s setting, Barbary Coast features the adventures of government agent Jeff Cable (played by William Shatner), and his pal, conman and gambler Cash ("Cash makes no enemies") Conover (Doug McClure; played by Dennis Cole in the pilot) who is the owner of the Golden Gate Casino. The title was taken from the setting, "a square-mile section of San Francisco called the Barbary Coast, a wide-open, rip-roaring district whose inhabitants ranged from flashy ladies to sourdoughs."

This was Shatner's first live-action series since Star Trek (also produced by Paramount Television).

Cable and Conover battled against various criminals, and Cable frequently donned disguises in the course of his investigations.

== Cast ==
In addition to Shatner and McClure, regulars on the series included:

- Richard Kiel - Moose Moran, the bouncer
- Dave Turner - Thumbs, the piano player
- Bobbi Jordan - Flame, the croupier
- Francine York - Brandy, a dance-hall girl
- Brooke Mills - Rusty, a dance-hall girl
- Francis Atkins - McCay, the poker dealer

== Schedule and production ==
Barbary Coast was broadcast initially on Mondays from 8 to 9 p.m. Eastern Time. Beginning October 31, 1975, it moved to Fridays from 8 to 9 p.m. ET and stayed there for the rest of its run. Its competition included Rhoda, Phyllis, Big Eddie, M*A*S*H, and films on CBS. Competing shows on NBC were The Invisible Man, Sanford and Son and Chico and the Man.

Because the show was broadcast during the Family Viewing Hour, on-screen violence was kept to a minimum. Reduction of shootings and visible deaths required revisions in scripts. At one point before it went on the air, ABC changed the title to Cash and Cable because "ABC decided the name conjured up a violent image," Shatner said. After some testing, however, executives determined that people preferred Barbary Coast.

Production was delayed for 10 days after Shatner's ankle was broken when a horse kicked him. After his return, rains collapsed tarpaulins that protected segments of the set, causing two crew members to nearly drown. Mosquitoes attacked the set "and a wide variety of illnesses appeared and spread from one worker to another."

Douglas Heyes was the series's creator. Cy Chermak was the executive producer. Directors included Bill Bixby, John Florea, Alex Grasshoff, and Don McDougall.

ABC had plans for a similarly titled show seventeen years earlier. The trade publication Billboard reported in its January 20, 1958, issue, "ABC-TV — Set Barney Girard to produce and direct Barbary Coast, Adventure story laid in early San Francisco."

== Critical response ==
Alex McNeil, in the book Total Television, described the program as a "limpid" Western.

John J. O'Connor, in a review in The New York Times, commented after the first episode that Barbary Coast and another show that premiered the same night "seem reasonable candidates for the disaster bin." He specified that production was "bad throughout" and referred to segments that featured dancing girls in Cash's casino with the comment, "But the entire Bolshoi Ballet would have difficulty salvaging Barbary Coast."

Alvin H. Marill, in the book Television Westerns, said the series "may or may not be considered a true Western" and went on to describe it as "an adventure/spy series".

== Episodes ==
No.	Title	Directed by	Written by	Original release date
0	"The Barbary Coast"	Bill Bixby	Douglas Heyes	May 4, 1975
Two-hour TV-movie and backdoor pilot.
1	"Funny Money"	Don Weis	Douglas Heyes	September 8, 1975
2	"Crazy Cats"	Don Weis	Harold Livingston	September 15, 1975
3	"Jesse Who?"	Bill Bixby	Howard Berk	September 22, 1975
4	"The Ballad of Redwing Jail"	John Florea	S : Douglas Heyes; T : William D. Gordon & James Doherty	September 29, 1975
5	"Guns for a Queen"	Don McDougall	S : Matthew Howard; T : William Putnam	October 6, 1975
6	"Irish Luck"	Alex Grasshoff	Harold Livingston	October 13, 1975
7	"Sauce for the Goose"	Don McDougall	S : Michael Lynn & George Reed; T : Stephen Lord	October 20, 1975
8	"An Iron-Clad Plan"	Herb Wallerstein	S : George Reed & Michael Lynn; T : L. Ford Neale & John Huff	October 31, 1975
9	"Arson and Old Lace"	Alex Grasshoff	Max Hodge	November 14, 1975
10	"Sharks Eat Sharks"	Bruce Bilson	James L. Henderson	November 21, 1975
11	"The Day Cable Was Hanged"	Alex Grasshoff	S : Howard Rayfiel & Kellam de Forest; T : Stephen Ford	December 26, 1975
12	"Mary Had More Than a Little"	Herb Wallerstein	Winston Miller	January 2, 1976
13	"The Dawson Marker"	Alex Grasshoff	William D. Gordon & James Doherty	January 9, 1976

== Awards and nominations ==
The pilot episode, an ABC Sunday Night Movie, was nominated for an Emmy Award for Art Direction for Jack De Shields and set decorator Reg Allen.
