= Rae Valentine =

American musician and actor

Rae Valentine (a.k.a. Harold Ray Brown II) is the son of Harold Ray Brown Sr., the founder and original drummer of the musical band War. Rae produced and recorded on War's 1994 Peace Sign album and performed on tour as backing keyboards, percussion and vocals from 1993 to 2001. Rae is also an actor who appeared in Running Mates (1992) starring Diane Keaton and Ed Harris, The Family Man (2000) starring Nicolas Cage and Sniper 2 (2002) starring Tom Berenger and Bokeem Woodbine.

== Filmography ==
- Running Mates (Secret Service)
- The Family Man (2000) (Mr. Thompson)
- Sniper 2 (2002) (Technician 1, as Rae Valentine)
