= Platinum Jazz =

Studio album by War
- Released: July 1977
- Recorded: 1971–1977
- Genre: Jazz fusion
- Length: 79:36
- Label: Blue Note/United Artists
- Producer: Jerry Goldstein, Lonnie Jordan, Howard Scott

War chronology
Love Is All Around (1976)	Platinum Jazz (1977)	Galaxy (1977)

Professional ratings
Review scores
Source	Rating
AllMusic	3/5 stars
Christgau's Record Guide	C+

Platinum Jazz is a double album, the ninth studio album by War, released on Blue Note Records in July 1977.

The album is an unusual entry in War's discography in several aspects. Its first half is new material, while its second half is a compilation of tracks from previous albums. It is also the only record they made for Blue Note, a jazz label, which was then owned and controlled by their current label at the time, United Artists Records, so it was not a matter of changing labels or going outside of contract. And it is their first album to put an emphasis on instrumental jazz-based music, although some tracks have vocals. This album was apparently Blue Note's first Platinum Disc selling album.

A single from the album was issued, also on Blue Note: "L.A. Sunshine" backed with "Slowly We Walk Together"; both are edited versions. The Album was released as re-issue in UK, on Island Records, as Platinum Funk and as a single album with tracks as Side 1 - War is Coming War is Coming, I got you, L.A.Sunshine (Shortened to 8.40 from original 11.52) Side 2 River Niger, Slowly We Walk Together, Platinum Jazz

== Packaging ==
The album was packaged as a companion disc to War's Greatest Hits album, and like that album, sports a cover showing a picture of the record itself, in the form of a platinum disc award (while the Greatest Hits cover showed a gold disc; but the actual records within both covers were on regular black vinyl). The cover was printed using metallic silver ink. Cover design concept is credited to Lee Oskar. The record labels on the cover resemble the actual record's labels, but are not an exact match, as the front cover label lists all tracks from sides one and two, and the back cover lists sides three and four, which is not done on the actual labels. (Note that the cover illustration shown here is from a reissue on MCA Records - whose successor Universal Music Group now owns Blue Note - as issued in Canada, and the cover's label design has been modified to replace the Blue Note logo with MCA. Furthermore, the records within this edition have labels that do not match the blue labels on the cover, the records having MCA's regular rainbow-on-black design. For CD reissue, the cover was further modified to show a logo for Avenue Records.) There are some other trivial inaccuracies in the picture: the records have no centre hole, the photo of the record has been mirror reversed (as seen from the run-out groove), and the matrix number (which is the actual album's matrix, and not mirror reversed) is inscribed over top of the run-out groove, which is never done (at least not deliberately) on actual records.

== Contents ==
The idea for the album began when the group briefly considered adding a second compilation disc of instrumental music to their Greatest Hits album, to demonstrate their wide range of musical styles. Blue Note expressed an interest in releasing an album of this type, which was feasible since War was in the process of switching from United Artists Records to MCA (allowing the group to record a one-off album for another label between contracts), as well as the fact that Blue Note was distributed by United Artists, and a licensing deal between the two labels for reissue of material from previous United Artists albums was possible. Unable to decide whether to stay with the compilation idea, or record a new album for Blue Note, the group decided to do both, and make it a double album. Six new tracks were recorded for disc one, but a wrinkle occurred at the last minute when United Artists decided it was willing to license their older recordings to the album only if they appeared in edited form. The list of songs to be licensed had already been decided, and their editing would have made the second disc much shorter than the first, so the order of songs was altered. The result was that the new material covers all of sides one and two, and the first track on side three, while the rest is a compilation of tracks from previous albums. Had the original sequence and full length songs been used, the two discs would have had total timings of 46:55 and 47:41 respectively. After trimming nearly 15 minutes from the reissued tracks, the album's total time was 79:36.

CD issues feature an edited version of "L.A. Sunshine" lasting 9:52.

== Track listing ==
All tracks composed by War (Papa Dee Allen, Harold Brown, B.B. Dickerson, Lonnie Jordan, Charles Miller, Lee Oskar, Howard E. Scott), except where indicated.

Side one

1. "War is Coming! War is Coming!" – 7:12
2. "Slowly We Walk Together" – 5:53
3. "Platinum Jazz" – 7:14

Side two

1. "I Got You" – 6:04
2. "L.A. Sunshine" (War, Jerry Goldstein) – 11:52

Side three

1. "River Niger" (War, Goldstein) – 8:40
2. "H_{2}Overture" – 3:59 (from Deliver the Word, original timing 4:38)
3. "City, Country, City" – 7:23 (from The World is a Ghetto, original timing 13:18)

Side four

1. "Smile Happy" – 3:59 (from Why Can't We Be Friends?, original timing 7:22)
2. "Deliver the Word" – 5:53 (from Deliver the Word, original timing 7:48)
3. "Nappy Head (theme from Ghetto Man)" – 4:12 (from All Day Music, original timing 6:05)
4. "Four Cornered Room" – 7:15 (from The World is a Ghetto, original timing 8:30)

== Personnel ==
War

- Howard Scott – guitar, percussion, vocals
- B.B. Dickerson – bass, percussion, vocals
- Lonnie Jordan – organ, piano, timbales, percussion, vocals
- Harold Brown – drums, percussion, vocals
- Papa Dee Allen – conga, bongos, percussion, vocals
- Charles Miller – clarinet, alto, tenor and baritone saxophones, percussion, vocals
- Lee Oskar – harmonica, percussion, vocals

Technical

- Jerry Goldstein in association with Lonnie Jordon and Howard Scott – producers, except:
  - Jerry Goldstein – producer on "Nappy Head"
- Ed Barton – engineer on sides one and two, and side three, track one
- Chris Huston – engineer on side three, tracks two and three, and side four
