= Life (Is So Strange) =

Studio album by War
- Released: 1983
- Length: 41:15
- Label: RCA Victor
- Producer: Jerry Goldstein, Lonnie Jordan

War chronology
The Music Band – Jazz (1983)	Life (Is So Strange) (1983)	Where There's Smoke (1985)

Life (Is So Strange) is an album by War, released on RCA Victor Records in 1983. The band's lineup is not stated on the cover, but composer credits suggest they had been reduced from eight members (on the previous album) to five.

The pop art cover references concerns about nuclear war in Los Angeles, the group's home. The Hollywood Sign appears in the upper right corner, and mushroom clouds are reflected in the woman's sunglasses. The back cover depicts office towers (identifiable as New York City buildings) being toppled by a nuclear explosion. Producer Jerry Goldstein also produced the album Nuclear Blues by Blood, Sweat and Tears a few years earlier, which had a cover depicting a post-nuclear urban street scene.

One single from the album was issued: "Life (is So Strange)" backed with "W.W. III".

== Track listing ==
All tracks composed by Jerry Goldstein, Papa Dee Allen, Lonnie Jordan, Howard E. Scott, Lee Oskar and Harold Brown, except where indicated.

Side one

1. "Life (Is So Strange)" – 5:58
2. "Happiness" – 7:39
3. "W.W. III (medley)" – 7:53
  1. "The Dawning of Night"
  2. "Waiting at the Church"
  3. "When the Nightime Comes"

Side two

1. "Shake It Down" (Goldstein, R. J. Ranois) – 4:58
2. "Summer Dreams" (Oskar) – 5:00
3. "U-2 (medley)" – 9:47
  1. "U-2 Part 1"
  2. "Automatic Eyes"
  3. "U-2 Part 2"
  4. "U-2 Part 3"

== Personnel ==
No personnel are listed on the cover, but previous War albums usually credit all members as composers, so the following is the likely lineup. Other instruments such as bass and saxophone may have been provided by the members below, or by session musicians.

- Papa Dee Allen – percussion, vocals
- Harold Brown – drums, percussion, vocals
- Lonnie Jordan – organ, piano, synthesizer, percussion, vocals
- Lee Oskar – harmonicas, vocals
- Howard Scott – guitar, vocals

Technical personnel

- Jerry Goldstein and Lonnie Jordon – producers
- John Fischback – recording and remix engineer
- Chris Huston – recording engineer
- Bernie Grundman – mastering engineer
- Mike Doud – art direction, design
- Lou Beach – illustration
