= War (band) =

American band

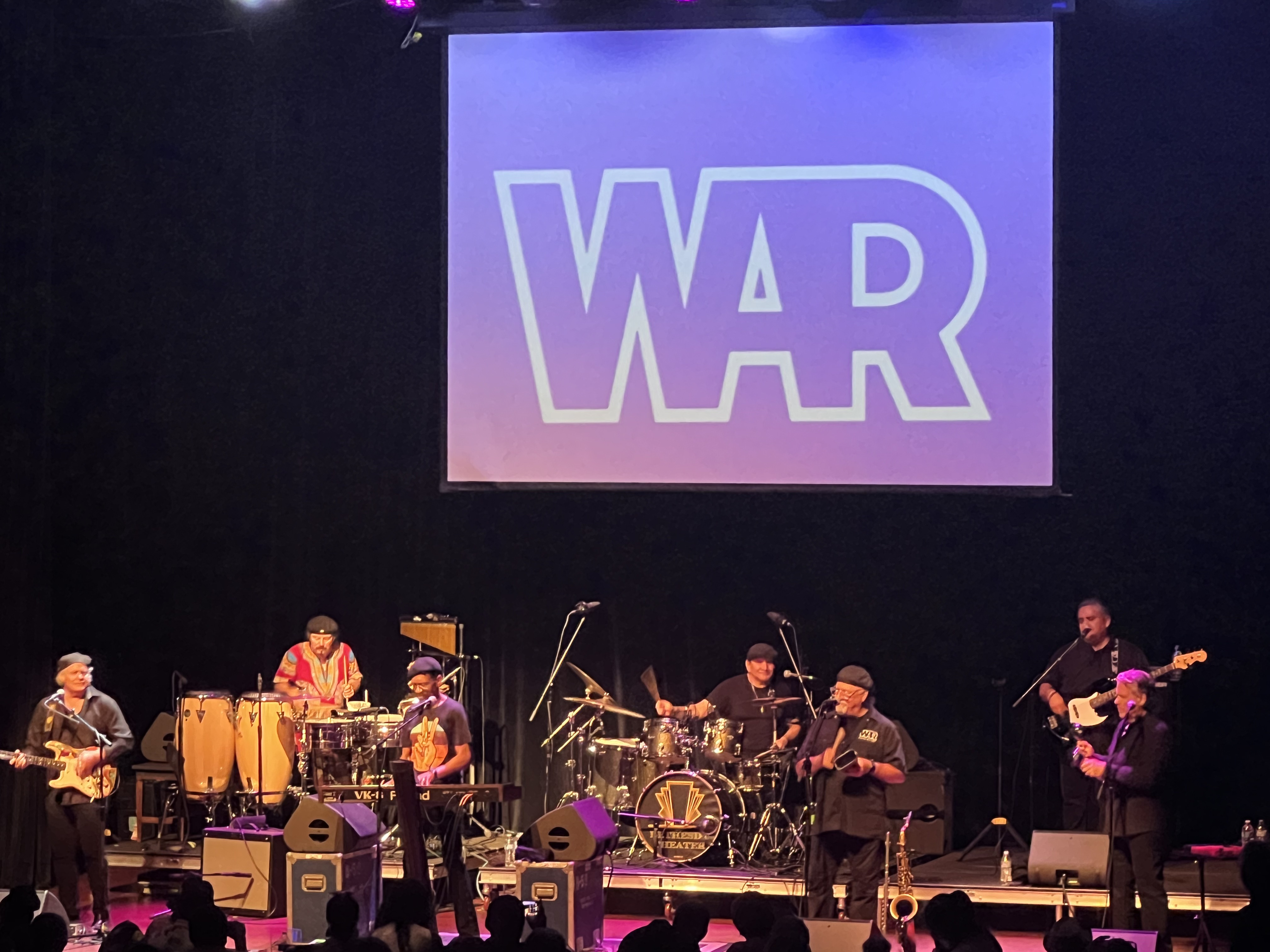
- War performing in 2024

Background information
- Also known as: Eric Burdon and War: (1969–70; 1976)
- Origin: Long Beach, California, U.S.
- Genres: Funk; soul; rock; R&B; Latin
- Years active: 1969–present
- Labels: MGM; United Artists; MCA; Avenue
- Spinoffs: Lowrider Band
- Members: Leroy "Lonnie" Jordan; James Zota Baker; Scott Martin; Stanley Behrens; Sal Rodriguez; Marcos Reyes; Trevor Huxley
- Past members: Eric Burdon; Harold Ray Brown; Howard E. Scott; Lee Oskar; B. B. Dickerson; Thomas "Papa Dee" Allen; Charles Miller; Ron Hammon; Pat Rizzo; Luther Rabb; Alice Tweed Smith; Ricky Green; Tetsuya "Tex" Nakamura; Rae Valentine; Kerry Campbell; Charles Green; J. B. Eckl; Lance Ellis; Smoky Greenwell; Sandro Alberto; Richard Marquez; Kenny Hudson; Fernando Harkless; Stuart Ziff; Pancho Tomaselli; Mitch Kashmar; David Urquidi; David "Pug" Rodriguez
- Website: war.com

War (originally called Eric Burdon and War) is an American funk/soul/rock band from Long Beach, California, formed in 1969.

The band is known for several hit songs in the 1970s (including "Spill the Wine", "The World Is a Ghetto", "The Cisco Kid", "Why Can't We Be Friends?", "Low Rider", and "Summer"). A musical crossover band, War became known for its eclectic blend of different musical styles, an amalgam of the sounds and styles the band members heard living in the racially diverse ghettos of Los Angeles.

Their album The World Is a Ghetto was Billboard's best-selling album of 1973. The band transcended racial and cultural barriers with a multi-ethnic lineup. War was subject to many lineup changes over the course of its existence, leaving member Leroy "Lonnie" Jordan as the only original member in the current lineup; four other members created a new group called the Lowrider Band.

== History ==
=== 1960s: Beginnings ===
In 1962, Howard E. Scott and Harold Brown formed a group called the Creators in Long Beach, California. Within a few years, they had added Charles Miller, Morris "B. B." Dickerson, and Lonnie Jordan to the lineup. Lee Oskar and Papa Dee Allen later joined as well. They all shared a love of diverse styles of music, which they had absorbed living in the racially mixed Los Angeles ghettos. The Creators recorded several singles on Dore Records while working with Tjay Contrelli, a saxophonist from the band Love. In 1968, the Creators became Nightshift (named because Brown worked nights at a steel yard) and started performing with Deacon Jones, who was also an American football player who was from the same era. The band then changed their name from Nightshift to War.

Nightshift was conceived by record producer Jerry Goldstein ("My Boyfriend's Back", "Hang on Sloopy", "I Want Candy") and singer Eric Burdon (ex-lead singer of the British band the Animals). In 1969, Goldstein saw musicians who would eventually become War playing at the Rag Doll in North Hollywood, backing Deacon Jones, the blues artist, and he was attracted to the band's sound. Jordan claimed that the band's goal was to spread a message of brotherhood and harmony, using instruments and voices to speak out against racism, hunger, gangs, crimes, and turf wars, and promote hope and the spirit of brotherhood. Eric Burdon and War began playing live shows to audiences throughout Southern California before entering into the studio to record their debut album Eric Burdon Declares "War". The album's best known track, "Spill the Wine", was a hit and launched the band's career.

=== 1970s: Height of popularity ===
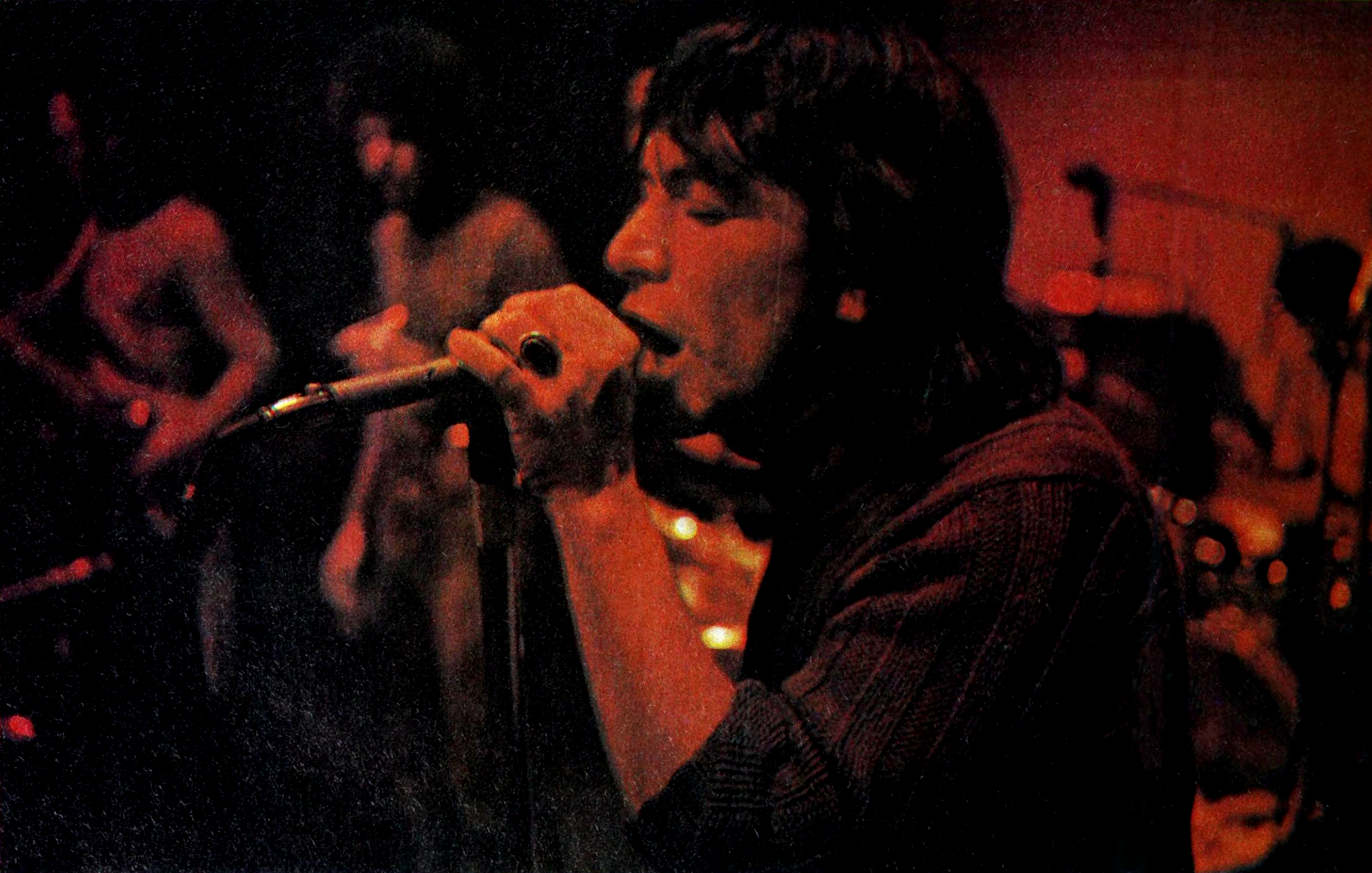
Eric Burdon performing with War, c. 1971.

Eric Burdon and War toured extensively across Europe and the United States. The subtitle of a 1970 review in the New Musical Express of their first UK gig in London's Hyde Park read: "Burdon and War: Best Live Band We've Ever Seen". Their show at Ronnie Scott's Club in London on September 16, 1970, is historically notable for being the last public performance for Jimi Hendrix, who joined them onstage for the last 35 minutes of Burdon and War's second set; a day later he was dead. A second Eric Burdon and War album, a two-disc set titled The Black-Man's Burdon, was released in 1970. During the subsequent tour, Burdon collapsed on the stage during a concert, caused by an asthma attack, and the band continued the tour without him before Burdon left the band in the middle of its European tour. They finished the tour without him and returned to record their first album as War.

War (1971) met with only modest success, but later that year, the band released All Day Music which included the singles "All Day Music" and "Slippin' into Darkness". The latter single sold over one million copies, and was awarded a gold disc by the R.I.A.A. in June 1972. In 1972, they released The World Is a Ghetto which was even more successful. Its second single, "The Cisco Kid", shipped gold, the album attained the number one spot on Billboard 200, and was Billboard magazine's Album of the Year as the best-selling album of 1973.

Deliver the Word (1973), the next album, contained the hits "Gypsy Man" and a studio version of "Me and Baby Brother" (previously issued as a live recording), which peaked at No. 8 and No. 15 on the Billboard chart. The album went on to sell nearly two million copies. The album Why Can't We Be Friends? was released in 1975. It included "Low Rider" and the title track, which were among the band's bigger hits.

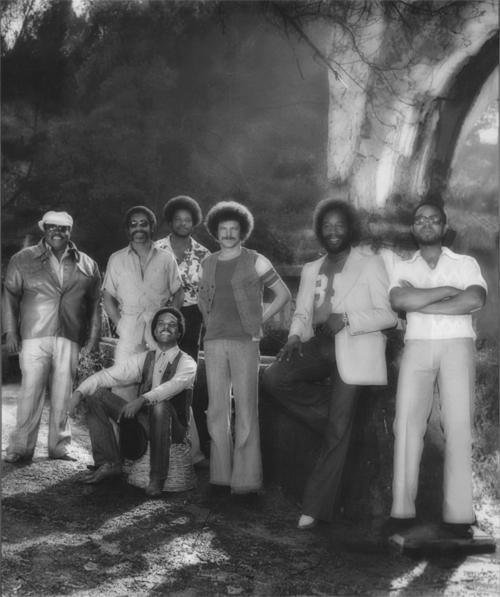
The original War lineup in 1976

In 1976, War released a greatest hits record that contained one new song "Summer", which, as a single, went gold and peaked at number 7 on the Billboard chart. Also released that year were Love Is All Around by Eric Burdon and War, containing mostly unreleased recordings from 1969 and 1970, and Platinum Jazz, a one-off album for jazz label Blue Note. The latter double album had cover art to match the greatest hits album, and was half new material and half compilation, focusing on (but not restricted to) instrumental music. The group continued to attain success with their next album Galaxy (1977), with its title single inspired by Star Wars. War's next project was a soundtrack album for the movie Youngblood in 1978.

=== 1980s: The Music Band ===
In 1979, following the departure of B. B. Dickerson during recording sessions for their next album (replaced by Luther Rabb on bass who completed the album), the band considered changing their name to the Music Band, but decided at the last minute to continue as War, and use "The Music Band" as the title of a series of albums. The series originally consisted of two studio albums (The Music Band, The Music Band 2, both in 1979) and a live album (The Music Band Live, 1980), but after the band left MCA in 1981 and had already made records for other labels, MCA expanded the series with a compilation (The Best of the Music Band, 1982) and a third original album of left-over material (The Music Band – Jazz, 1983).

The group lost another member when Charles Miller (saxophone) was murdered in 1980. He had already been replaced by Pat Rizzo (ex Sly and the Family Stone) in 1979. Other new members joining at this time were Alice Tweed Smith (credited as "Tweed Smith" and "Alice Tweed Smyth" on various albums) on percussion and vocals (giving the band its first female vocalist), and Ronnie Hammon as a third drummer.

After making the one-off single "Cinco de Mayo" for LAX Records in 1981 (Jerry Goldstein's own label, which also reissued Eric Burdon Declares "War" under the title Spill the Wine the same year), War signed with RCA Victor Records and recorded Outlaw (1982) which included the single plus additional singles "You Got the Power", "Outlaw", and "Just Because". It was followed by Life (is So Strange) (1983) from which the title track was also a single. War's records from 1979 to 1983 were not as successful as those from the preceding decade, and after the two RCA albums, the band's activities became sporadic. They did not record another full album until a decade later. The 1987 compilation album The Best of War ...and More included two new tracks, "Livin' in the Red" and "Whose Cadillac Is That?", and a version of "Low Rider" remixed by Arthur Baker (in addition to the original version). Papa Dee Allen died of a brain aneurysm which struck him onstage in August 1988. He was 57 years old.

=== 1990s: Reformations ===
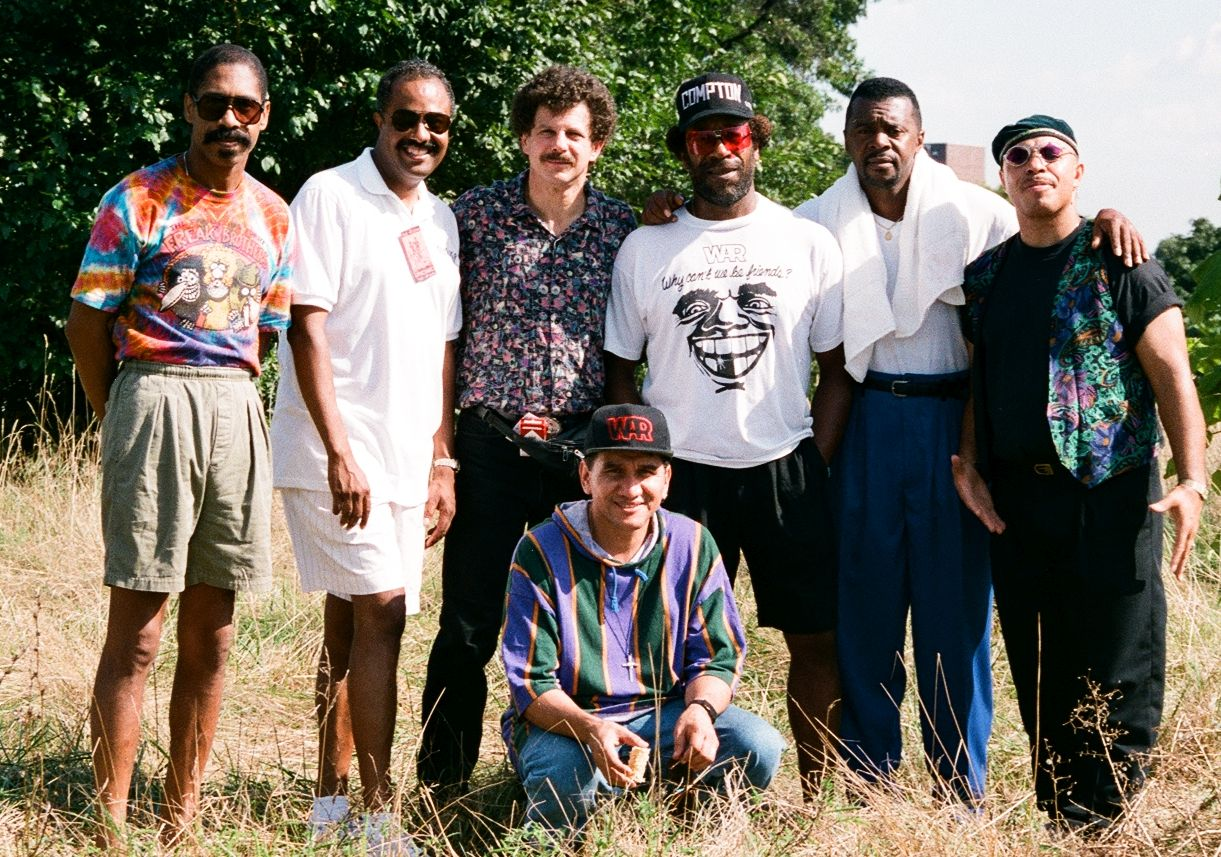
War in 1992

Sampling of War by hip hop artists was prevalent enough to merit the compilation album Rap Declares War in 1992, which was sanctioned by the band. In 1993, War reformed with most surviving previous members (including original members Brown, Jordan, Oskar, and Scott, and later members Hammon and Rizzo), augmented by a large lineup of supporting musicians and still under the management and production of Jerry Goldstein, and released a new album, ☮, in 1994.

In 1996, the group attempted to gain independence from Goldstein, but were unable to do so under the name "War" which remains a trademark owned by Goldstein and Far Out Productions. In response, Brown, Oskar, Scott, and a returning B. B. Dickerson (who had not worked with War since 1979) adopted a name which referenced one of War's biggest hits: Lowrider Band. They have yet to record a studio album.

Lonnie Jordan opted to remain with Goldstein and create a new version of War with himself as the only original member. Some other musicians who had joined between 1983 and 1993 were also part of the new lineup. Both the "new" War and the Lowrider Band are currently active as live performance acts.

1996 also saw the release of a double CD compilation, Anthology (1970–1994), later updated in 2003 with a few track substitutions, as The Very Best of War. Another CD compilation from 1999, Grooves and Messages, included a second disc of remixes done by various producers.

=== 21st century ===
On April 21, 2008, Eric Burdon performed "Spill the Wine" with War in concert at the London Royal Albert Hall, released as Greatest Hits Live on Avenue/Rhino Records, who also reissued much of War's back catalog that year.

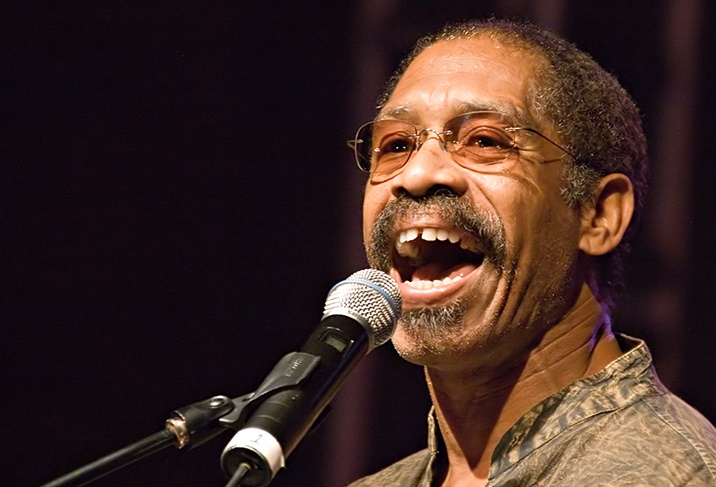
Lonnie Jordan in concert in 2008. Jordan is the only remaining original member of the band

War were unsuccessfully nominated for induction into the Rock and Roll Hall of Fame in 2009 and 2014.

In 2014, War released a new studio album, Evolutionary, as a double CD, the second disc being a reissue of their Greatest Hits album from 1976.

On June 5, 2025, War received a star on the Hollywood Walk of Fame with all surviving original core members present including Jerry Goldstein, Charles Miller's children, and B.B Dickerson's son.

== Musical style ==
This band lives up to its name. The powerful, deceptively torpid groove evokes the pace of inner-city pleasures like 'All Day Music' and 'Summer.' But however jokey and off-the-cuff they sound, they're usually singing about conflict, often racial conflict—the real subject of 'The Cisco Kid' and 'Why Can't We Be Friends?,' which many take for novelty songs.

— Christgau's Record Guide: Rock Albums of the Seventies (1981)

According to music writer Colin Larkin, their "potent fusion of funk, R&B, rock and Latin styles produced a progressive soul sound", while Martin C. Strong calls them "one of the fiercest progressive soul combos of the '70s". The liner notes to the 2003 greatest hits album The Very Best of War described the band's sound as a mix of "rock, jazz, Latin, and R&B", while The Maui News described the band's sound in an October 2024 article as blending "R&B, rock, Latin music, jazz, and blues."

== Members ==
=== Current ===
- Leroy "Lonnie" Jordan – keyboards, lead vocals, occasional guitar (1969–present)
- James Zota Baker – guitar, vocals (1998–2002, 2023–present)
- Scott Martin – saxophone, flute (2017–present)
- Stanley Behrens – harmonica (2011–present)
- Sal Rodriguez – drums, percussion, vocals (1990–present)
- Marcos Reyes – percussion (1998–present)
- Rene Camacho – bass (2014–present)

=== Original ===
- Howard E. Scott – guitar, vocals (1969–1994)
- Lee Oskar – harmonica, vocals (1969–1994)
- Charles Miller – saxophone, flute, vocals (1969–1979; died 1980)
- Leroy "Lonnie" Jordan – keyboards, vocals (1969–present)
- B. B. Dickerson – bass, vocals (1969–1979; died 2021)
- Harold Ray Brown – drums, vocals (1969–1994)
- Thomas "Papa Dee" Allen – percussion, vocals (1969–1988; died 1988)
- Eric Burdon – vocals, percussion (1969–1971, 2008)

=== Past ===
- Ron Hammon – drums, percussion (1979–1996)
- Pat Rizzo – saxophone, flute, vocals (1979–1983, 1993–1995; died 2021)
- Luther Rabb – bass, vocals (1979–1984; died 2006)
- Alice Tweed Smith – percussion, vocals (1979–1981)
- Ricky Green – bass, vocals (1984–1989)
- Tetsuya "Tex" Nakamura – harmonica, vocals (1993–2006)
- Rae Valentine – keyboards, percussion, vocals (1993–2001)
- Kerry Campbell – saxophone (1993–1998)
- Charles Green – saxophone, flute (1993–1995)
- J. B. Eckl – guitar, vocals (1994–1996)
- Lance Ellis – saxophone, flute (1994–2020)
- Smoky Greenwell – harmonica (1994–1996)
- Sandro Alberto – guitar, vocals (1996–1998)
- Richard Marquez – drums, percussion (1996–1997)
- Kenny Hudson – percussion (1997–1998)
- Fernando Harkless – saxophone (1998–2011)
- Stuart Ziff – guitar, vocals (2002–2023)
- Pancho Tomaselli – bass, vocals (2003–February 2015)
- Mitch Kashmar – harmonica, vocals (2006–2011)
- David Urquidi – saxophone, flute (2011–2017)
- David "Pug" Rodriguez – percussion, vocals (2011–2019)
