= Galaxy (War album) =

Studio album by War
- Released: 1977
- Recorded: 1977
- Genre: Jazz-funk
- Length: 40:27
- Label: MCA
- Producer: Jerry Goldstein

War chronology
Platinum Jazz (1976)	Galaxy (1977)	Youngblood (Original Motion Picture Soundtrack) (1978)

Singles from Galaxy
- 1. "Galaxy" Released: November 7, 1977; 2. "Hey Señorita" Released: 1978

Galaxy is the tenth studio album by the American band War, released in 1977. It was their first album released on MCA Records. The album was certified gold by the RIAA.

== Critical reception ==
Professional ratings
Review scores
Source	Rating
AllMusic	2/5 stars
Christgau's Record Guide	B
The Rolling Stone Album Guide	3/5 stars

Reviewing in Christgau's Record Guide: Rock Albums of the Seventies (1981), Robert Christgau wrote: "The first side of the most unambitious album they've ever made works beautifully as what it is—P-Funk on thorazine, with the phrasemaking acuity of previous War records reduced to one title, 'Sweet Fighting Lady.' Side two winds down from a pretty good hit single into fourteen minutes of carrying unambitiousness way too far." The Bay State Banner wrote that Galaxy, "with the exception of one cut, is a laid-back tropical-flavored jazz-funk album."

== Track listing ==
All tracks written by War and Jerry Goldstein, with the exception of "The Seven Tin Soldiers" written by War

Side one

1. "Galaxy" – 8:11
2. "Baby Face (She Said Do Do Do Do)" – 5:04
3. "Sweet Fighting Lady" – 7:10

Side two

1. "Hey Señorita" – 5:47
2. "The Seven Tin Soldiers" – 14:15

== Personnel ==
- Charles Miller – alto, tenor and baritone saxophones, vocals, clarinet, percussion
- Lee Oskar – harmonica, percussion
- Howard Scott – guitar, vocals, percussion
- Lonnie Jordan – organ, vocals, piano, synthesizer, timbales, percussion
- B.B. Dickerson – bass, vocals, percussion
- Harold Brown – drums, vocals, percussion
- Papa Dee Allen – congas, vocals, bongos, percussion
- Patricia Rojas – voice (4)

== Charts ==
=== Weekly charts ===
Weekly chart performance for Galaxy
Chart (1977)	Peak position
Australia Albums (Kent Music Report)	53
US Billboard 200	15
US Top R&B/Hip-Hop Albums (Billboard)	6

=== Year-end charts ===
Year-end chart performance for Galaxy
Chart (1978)	Position
US Billboard 200	95
US Top R&B/Hip-Hop Albums (Billboard)	37

== Certifications ==
Certifications and sales for Galaxy
Region	Certification	Certified units/sales
United States (RIAA)	Gold	500,000^{^}
^{*} Sales figures based on certification alone.^{^} Shipments figures based on certification alone.^{‡} Sales+streaming figures based on certification alone.
