= Pat Rizzo =

American saxophonist and flautist (1941–2021)

- Born: Pascal Peter Rizzo; November 30, 1941; New York City, New York, USA
- Origin: United States
- Died: April 15, 2021 (aged 79) Palm Springs, California, USA
- Genres: soul, funk, rock
- Occupations: Saxophonist, flautist, songwriter
- Instruments: Alto saxophone, tenor saxophone, flute
- Years active: 1960s–2021
- Formerly of: The Cuff Links; Sly and the Family Stone; War

Pat Rizzo (November 30, 1941 – April 15, 2021) was an American saxophonist and flautist, best known for his work with soul/rock/funk bands Sly and the Family Stone and War.

== Life and career ==
Born Pascal Peter Rizzo, Pat grew up in Astoria, Queens, in a household filled with music. After being rejected from his elementary school band for already playing the piano, a heartbroken Pat returned the next day proudly announcing he joined the band playing the triangle. After graduating in 1959 from William Cullen Bryant High School, he went to the Vermont School of Music where he debuted as a flute soloist in six months, before continuing his studies at the Manhattan School of Music.

Rizzo started performing in the late 1960s with The Cuff Links. He is best known for his work as saxophonist and flautist with funk band Sly and the Family Stone. He was intended as a replacement for founding member Jerry Martini, who got into trouble with Sly Stone and his accountants for inquiring about money rightfully due to him, but both Martini and Rizzo remained in the band and became good friends. He later replaced Charles Miller in War. During this period he also performed with Tito Puente and Frank Sinatra.

Rizzo appeared on Ry Cooder's 1976 album Chicken Skin Music, 1977 live album Show Time and his 1978 album Jazz. He also accompanied Cooder on his 1977 tour in Europe.

== Compositions ==
Rizzo is credited as composer of the Sly and the Family Stone song, "Ha Ha Hee Hee". During the recording sessions for the band's Small Talk album, Rizzo co-wrote the song with Jerry Martini.

== Personal life ==
Rizzo was married to Kelli J Ball (Mickeliunas), an international fashion model. The couple divorced. He died in April 2021 at the age of 79 after a 5-year battle with cancer.
