= Luther Rabb =

American singer-songwriter

- Born: Luther James Rabb; September 7, 1942
- Origin: Seattle, Washington, U.S.
- Died: January 22, 2006 (aged 63)
- Genres: Jazz rock, experimental rock
- Occupation: Musician
- Instruments: Vocals, bass
- Years active: 1969–1986
- Label: Columbia Records (US)

Luther James Rabb (September 7, 1942 – January 22, 2006) was an American singer, musician, and songwriter, from Seattle, Washington, who gained notoriety as the lead vocalist of the jazz rock group Ballin' Jack and in later years as a member of the group War.

== Early history ==
The son of a minister, Luther grew up in Seattle. He learned to play practicing on his grandmother's piano. He began learning sax at the age of ten. As a teenager he was doing gigs at his local rotary club. He was also a sax player in The Velvetones which was Jimi Hendrix's first band. Between that time and his membership with Ballin' Jack, he had been with the groups The Stags, The Nite Sounds, and The Emergency Exit.

== Seventies onwards ==
Luther was a member of Ballin' Jack, a group he had founded in 1969; he stayed with them until the group's break-up in or around 1974. In 1976 he had become part of Santana as the group's lead singer and was on tour with them in 1976. He cut an LP as a member of West Coast Revival that was released without success on LAX Interternational in 1977, by which time he was working with Lola Falana. He released a solo LP in 1979 and by the 1980s he was a member of the group War.

Rabb died in January 2006 at the age of 63.

== Discography ==
=== Singles ===
- "Make a Little Move (On the One)" / "Street Angels" (1979) MCA Mca 40997
- "Seattle Sonics Do It" / "Seattle Sonics Do It" (1979) MCA Mca 41066
- "Every Day Love" / "Whatever" (1979) MCA Mca 41104

=== Albums ===
- Street Angel (1979) MCA Records Mca-3079

=== Sound tracks ===
- "Bucktown Song" in the closing credits of the 1975 film Bucktown.
