= Xmas Ear Bender =

EP by Slade
- Released: 28 November 1980
- Genre: Rock
- Length: 10:54
- Label: Cheapskate
- Producer: Slade

Slade chronology
Alive at Reading (1980)	Xmas Ear Bender (1980)	We'll Bring the House Down (1981)

"Xmas Ear Bender" is an extended play (EP) by the British rock band Slade, released in 1980. Xmas Ear Bender includes three tracks; two of which were recorded at the band's performance at the 1980 Reading Festival. The EP was produced by Slade and reached No. 70 in the UK, remaining in the charts for two weeks. The EP was later included in its entirety on the 2006 Salvo compilation Slade Alive! – The Live Anthology.

== Background ==
Having returned to the UK from the United States in August 1976, Slade found themselves out-of-favour at the time of the UK's Punk rock explosion. The band's 1977 album Whatever Happened to Slade proved a commercial failure while their tour that spring had shown that they could no longer fill large venues. Slade's waning success soon led to the band playing small gigs after that, including universities and clubs. Despite being successful at filling small venues for their live performances, the band's new records were barely selling. After the commercial failure of the band's 1979 album Return to Base and 1980 EP Six of the Best, the band were on the verge of disbanding. The band's fortunes changed after they were offered a headlining slot at the Reading festival in August 1980, following a late cancellation by Ozzy Osbourne. The band's performance in front of the 65,000-strong crowd was a triumph and the band found themselves back in the public eye. The music press began to take an interest in the band again, while heavy metal followers also began deeming the band 'cool'.

Slade's entire performance at the festival was recorded by BBC and forty-five minutes of their set was soon broadcast on the Friday Rock Show. In order to capitalise on their new-found success, and in response to the many requests made for a Reading-related release, the band decided to release the Alive at Reading EP. Released in October 1980, it reached No. 44 in the UK, giving the band their first chart action since 1977. In November, its follow-up, Xmas Ear Bender, was released and peaked at No 70. Both EPs, along with the Polydor compilation Slade Smashes! continued public interest in the band, allowing them time to plan their next steps for 1981. The band would return to the UK Top Ten with "We'll Bring the House Down" in early 1981, while the album of the same name would also be a UK Top 30 success.

Xmas Ear Bender was released on 7" vinyl in the UK only on Cheapskate Records. The EP featured two songs from the Reading Festival. The first was a forty-second, crowd singalong version of "Merry Xmas Everybody", which was credited to "Slade and the Reading Choir". The other Reading track was "Get Down and Get With It". The EP's version of "Okey Cokey" was not performed at Reading, but was the band's 1979 studio recording of the song with crowd noise added at the beginning and end to fit in with the other tracks.

== Track listing ==
1. "Merry Xmas Everybody" (with the Reading Choir) – 0:39 (Noddy Holder, Jim Lea)
2. "Okey Cokey" – 3:24 (Jimmy Kennedy)
3. "Get Down and Get With It" – 6:48 (Bobby Marchan)

== Personnel ==
Slade

- Noddy Holder – lead vocals, guitar, producer, mixing
- Dave Hill – lead guitar, backing vocals, producer, mixing
- Jim Lea – bass, backing vocals, producer, mixing
- Don Powell – drums, producer, mixing

Additional personnel

- Audience on "Merry Xmas Everybody" – The Reading Choir
- Mike "Mad Robbo" Robinson – mixing

== Charts ==
Chart (1980)	Peak position
UK Singles (OCC)	70
UK The Singles Chart (Record Business)	74
