= We'll Bring the House Down =

Studio album by Slade
- Released: 13 March 1981
- Recorded: 1979–1981
- Genre: Hard rock
- Length: 30:49
- Label: Cheapskate
- Producer: Slade; Chas Chandler (track 8)

Slade chronology
Slade Smashes! (1980)	We'll Bring the House Down (1981)	Till Deaf Do Us Part (1981)

Singles from We'll Bring the House Down
- 1. "We'll Bring the House Down" Released: 23 January 1981; 2. "Wheels Ain't Coming Down" Released: 27 March 1981

We'll Bring the House Down is the ninth studio album by the British rock group Slade. It was released on 13 March 1981 and reached No. 25 in the UK. The album was produced by Slade, except "My Baby's Got It" which was produced by Chas Chandler. The album was the first studio album released by the band after their successful appearance at the 1980 Reading Festival. In order to capitalise on their revival, Slade quickly compiled this new album, made up of some new tracks and some recycled ones, mainly from their failed Return to Base album of 1979.

== Background ==
"We'll Bring the House Down"
Slade's first top 10 hit in the UK since 1975

"Wheels Ain't Coming Down"
Slade's follow up single to We'll Bring the House Down

Since their return from the US in late 1976, Slade had struggled to achieve much chart action in the UK. Regardless, the band continued to record and tour. Their 1977 theatre tour, which followed the unsuccessful Whatever Happened to Slade album, saw a drop in audience numbers. The band found themselves playing small gigs after that, including universities and clubs. The band's tours often ran at a loss, bringing their own PA and lightshow, while the band's new material, released through manager Chas Chandler's Barn Records sold little.

After the commercial failure of their May 1980 extended play Six of the Best, the band had almost called it a day. However, their fortunes changed when they were offered a headlining slot at the Reading festival in August 1980, following a late cancellation by Ozzy Osbourne. The band's performance in front of the 65,000-strong crowd saw Slade back in the public eye. The music press began to take an interest in the band again, while heavy metal followers also began deeming the band 'cool'. In September, the band released the extended play Alive at Reading, which featured three songs recorded at the festival. It reached No. 44, giving the band their first chart action in years. The band's former label Polydor did not take long to jump on the band's new-found success either, releasing the compilation Slade Smashes! in November. It reached No. 21 and soon achieved Gold status in December for selling over 200,000 copies.

In January 1981, Slade released the single "We'll Bring the House Down" which reached No. 10 in the UK. In March, the album of the same name was released, reached No. 25. The album helped maintain the band's momentum, while they were also able to start playing in larger venues once again. A second single, "Wheels Ain't Coming Down", was also released in March, reaching No. 60.

== Release ==
Shortly before the album's release, guitarist Dave Hill explained in a fan club interview why the album mainly used tracks that had already been released:

"Obviously a lot of the fans that have bought Return to Base, Six of the best and one or two other things - they are going to have a lot of this material. But it is a compilation LP of a lot of the material that we have recorded over the last 18 months, which as the fans know, the majority of the public have never even heard. It's really for the benefit of the new fans that have none of the old material. It won't be the same as Return to Base as it will have a lot of the tracks pulled out and other numbers added, making up a more rocky album. It will basically consist of the live act at the moment, so anyone who's into the live act should like the album."

The album's sleeve featured a new Slade logo designed by Chandler. According to the band, the 'fist' bursting through the shield on the sleeve was to signify "four royal bastards".

== Song information ==
"We'll Bring the House Down", Slade's first hit single since 1977, is described by AllMusic as an "absolute must-hear". "Night Starvation" originally appeared on Six of the Best and was also released as a promotional single in the UK during 1980. "When I'm Dancin' I Ain't Fightin'", taken from Six of the Best, is described by AllMusic as "pure classic Slade". "Dizzy Mamma" was originally the B-Side to the 1979 failed single "Ginny, Ginny". For its inclusion on We'll Bring the House Down, the song was remixed by the band at Portland Studios. "Nuts Bolts and Screws", taken from Return to Base, was the other song to be remixed at Portland Studios for inclusion on the album.

"Lemme Love into Ya" had also been re-worked into the song "Poland", which Lea recorded as a solo venture. His version was released as a single in 1982 on Speed Records under the name Greenfields of Tong. "Lemme Love into Ya" was voted number two of the top three Slade album tracks in the Slade Fan Club Poll of 1979.

== Critical reception ==
Professional ratings
Review scores
Source	Rating
AllMusic	4/5 stars
Classic Rock	favourable
Daily Mirror	favourable
Daily Star	favourable
Get Ready to Rock!	4/5 stars
London Trax	favourable
Melody Maker	favourable
Record Mirror	3.5/5 stars
Smash Hits	6/10 stars
Sounds	5/5 stars

Upon release, Daily Star described the album as the "same old Slade style – thumping, no-nonsense, high-decibel rock". Record Mirror stated: "It's difficult to justify a record like this on its own terms. Slade are essentially a live act and on vinyl the vital ingredient of spilt beer is sorely missed. But all things considered the pros outweigh the cons." Steve Keaton of Sounds stated that the album is a "corker, brimming with a knowing confidence and expertise that has far from withered through age" and contains "ten tracks of rejuvenated roguery guaranteed to cause severe structural damage to the sturdiest of dwellings and delight the most surly of yobs". They concluded, "We'll Bring The House Down is an invaluable addition to the realms of demolition rock. Slade are back with a vengeance!" Melody Maker felt the album merely "fulfil[led] a function", adding that beyond the hit title track "they've come up with at least four far better tracks to ensure the stay won't be shortlived."

Bob Edmands of NME believed that Slade's comeback "must be a good thing" and noted how they are "certainly unrepentant about big, fat riffs performed remorselessly" with a "good-natured, optimistic approach". He continued, "Not all the songs here are vintage Slade, but they do seem to have thrown off the ennui that overcame them in the mid-'70s. Even when the muses haven't blessed individual tunes, Slade work hard to keep everybody's spirits up." London Trax said: "Overlooking the horrific, infantile, metallist symbolism of its sleeve, We'll Bring the House Down is somewhat surprisingly a bit of a cracker. Potential singles abound. To sum up, Slade have released a great pop record and have more than adequately recaptured the territory left open, since their untimely demise. They have resurrected the legend without smothering it." Smash Hits felt the album lived up to a "dreaded Heavy Metal revival" rather than maintain their "natural pop sensibility". They concluded: "They sound as raw and live as ever and Noddy Holder still has a unique set of vocal chords but play this next to their "Greatest Hits" and there really is no competition. They can do better than this."

AllMusic retrospectively stated: "Slade made a powerful statement with We'll Bring the House Down: "We're back." What the band did was to take the best five songs from Return to Base and mix them in with great new material for a killer album that wouldn't take forever to make. Simple logic will tell you that when you get rid of the worst songs and replace them with great songs, the album's gonna be a lot better. Such is the case here." Joe Geesin of the webzine Get Ready to Rock! described the album as a "mixture of metal, rock 'n' roll and new wave pop that worked remarkably well."

== Track listing ==
All tracks are written by Noddy Holder and Jim Lea, except "I'm a Rocker" by Chuck Berry and "Okey Cokey" by Jimmy Kennedy.

Side one
No.	Title	Length
1.	"We'll Bring the House Down"	3:32
2.	"Night Starvation"	3:05
3.	"Wheels Ain't Coming Down"	3:37
4.	"Hold on to Your Hats"	2:33
5.	"When I'm Dancin' I Ain't Fightin'"	3:09

Side two
No.	Title	Length
6.	"Dizzy Mamma"	3:37
7.	"Nuts Bolts and Screws"	2:29
8.	"My Baby's Got It"	2:35
9.	"Lemme Love into Ya"	3:26
10.	"I'm a Rocker"	2:42

2007 Salvo remaster bonus tracks
No.	Title	Length
11.	"Chakeeta" (from Return to Base)	2:28
12.	"Don't Waste Your Time (Back Seat Star)" (from Return to Base)	3:29
13.	"Sign of the Times" (from Return to Base)	3:58
14.	"I'm Mad" (from Return to Base)	2:48
15.	"Ginny, Ginny" (from Return to Base)	3:40
16.	"Not Tonight Josephine" (B-side of "Sign of the Times")	3:03
17.	"Okey Cokey" (1979 non-album single)	3:25
18.	"9 to 5" (from Six of the Best)	2:54

== Personnel ==
Slade

- Noddy Holder – lead vocals, rhythm guitar, producer
- Dave Hill – lead guitar, backing vocals, producer
- Jim Lea – bass, keyboards, synthesizer, backing vocals, producer
- Don Powell – drums, producer

Additional personnel

- Chas Chandler – producer (track 8)
- Andy Miller – engineer
- Dave Garland, Mark O'Donoughue – assistant engineers
- George Peckham – mastering (cutting engineer)
- Laurie Richards – art direction
- Chas Chandler – cover concept

== Charts ==
Chart performance for We'll Bring the House Down
Chart (1981)	Peak position
UK Albums (Official Charts)	25
UK Top 60 Albums/Tapes (Record Business)	22
