= Slade Alive, Vol. 2 =

Live album by Slade
- Released: 20 October 1978
- Recorded: USA autumn 1976 & UK spring 1977
- Genre: Hard rock; glam rock
- Length: 41:01
- Label: Barn
- Producer: Chas Chandler

Slade chronology
| Whatever Happened to Slade? (1977) | Slade Alive, Vol. 2 (1978) | Return to Base (1979) |

Slade Alive, Vol. 2 is the second live album by the British rock band Slade. It was released on 20 October 1978 and did not enter the charts. Titled as the follow-up to the band's commercially and critically successful 1972 album Slade Alive!, the performances on Slade Alive, Vol. 2 were taken from the band's autumn 1976 tour of the United States and their spring 1977 UK tour. The album was produced by Chas Chandler.

== Background ==
After a period of trying to crack the American market, Slade returned to the UK in 1976 to find music industry much changed from when they had left in 1975. Punk rock and New wave had exploded to become the dominant influences on youth culture and the music press. Despite Slade's reputation as one of the great high-energy bands of their day, in this environment they had become irrelevant. Their 1977 album Whatever Happened to Slade was a commercial failure and they found they could no longer fill large venues on their UK spring tour.

The band recorded some of the shows on their autumn 1976 US and spring 1977 UK tours. In late 1977, they began going through these recordings to assemble a new live album, hoping that their reputation as a live band would translate to commercial success when released on record, just like it had done with Slade Alive! in 1972. Speaking to Record Mirror in 1977, Noddy Holder revealed, "We're going through 12 hours of tapes for a live album. It'll be quite a mixture of material. Slade Alive! really cracked us as an albums band and being a live band is what we're all about."

Slade Alive, Vol. 2 was released in October 1978, but it was a commercial failure, and Slade would only regain popularity after performing at the Reading Festival in 1980.

== Track listing ==
All songs written by Noddy Holder and Jim Lea except "My Baby Left Me" by Arthur Crudup.

Side one
| No. | Title | Length |
|---|---|---|
| 1. | "Get on Up" | 6:01 |
| 2. | "Take Me Bak 'Ome" | 4:19 |
| 3. | "My Baby Left Me" | 2:41 |
| 4. | "Be" | 3:50 |
| 5. | "Mama Weer All Crazee Now" | 3:58 |

Side two
| No. | Title | Length |
|---|---|---|
| 6. | "Burning in the Heat of Love" | 3:45 |
| 7. | "Everyday" | 3:35 |
| 8. | "Gudbuy T'Jane" | 4:58 |
| 9. | "One Eyed Jacks with Moustaches" | 3:24 |
| 10. | "Cum On Feel the Noize" | 4:20 |

== Critical reception ==
Professional ratings
Review scores
| Source | Rating |
|---|---|
| AllMusic | 4/5 stars |
| Record Mirror | 3/5 stars |

Upon its release, David Ballantine of the Belfast News Letter praised Slade Alive, Vol. 2 as "good stomping heavy metal stuff with a melodic awareness". He added that Holder's "improved voice puts the seal on its goodness" and singled out "Burnin' in the Heat of Love" as "tremendous". A reviewer for the Whitstable Times said that the album "exudes a boisterous, exuberant goodtime feel", with Slade "really com[ing] into their own before live crowds as this album demonstrates". Sheila Prophet of Record Mirror described it as a "worthwhile, if not exactly essential purchase, and enough possibly, to get the group back on an even keel". She believed the live performances of the older tracks were the highlights of the album and advised listeners to "forget the new stuff" as Slade's "ability to turn out those neat, complete, stompalong ditties seems lost forever". She concluded: "Slade are essentially a live band. No matter how good their records are, they'll never match up. All they'll ever be are plastic souvenirs of a great live show."

Pauline McLeod of the Daily Mirror called it "adequate enough, but probably not as familiar or as good as their material on Volume One". Lee Russell of The Sunday Post noted a number of the band's old hits, but added that "where Slade move from familiar ground all the restless energy can't lift them to new heights". Dave Murray of the Reading Evening Post remarked, "Listening to this, you begin to realise why Slade aren't a bigger band today. They're loud and fun, but the fate they suffer is no different from other rock 'n' roll bands who teeter on the edge of heavy metal but with one foot still firmly in the Top of the Pops studio. Headbangers won't accept that you can be a live band and a singles band at the same time."

In a retrospective review, Geoff Ginsberg of AllMusic said: "Slade Alive, Vol. 2, like all live Slade, is searing. The album is excellent, both in terms of performance and sound quality. They also did a great job of selecting material for this disc. A nice balance of classics and newer material that hadn't really been heard before. Slade has by this point developed into a full-fledged heavy metal band while retaining everything that made them great in the first place."

== Personnel ==
Slade

- Noddy Holder - lead vocals, rhythm guitar
- Dave Hill - lead guitar, backing vocals
- Jim Lea - bass, backing vocals
- Don Powell - drums

Additional personnel

- Chas Chandler - producer
- Alwyn Clayden - design (cover)
- Alex Agor - photography
- Alan Goldberg - stage lighting
