= Alive at Reading =

EP by Slade
- Released: 3 October 1980
- Genre: Rock
- Length: 13:14
- Label: Cheapskate
- Producer: Slade

Slade chronology
| Six of the Best (EP) (1980) | Alive at Reading (1980) | Xmas Ear Bender (EP) (1980) |

"'Alive at Reading'" is an extended play (EP) by the British rock band Slade, released in 1980. Alive at Reading includes three live tracks recorded at the band's performance at the 1980 Reading Festival. The EP was produced by Slade and reached No. 44 in the UK, remaining in the charts for five weeks. The EP was later included in its entirety on the 2006 Salvo compilation Slade Alive! – The Live Anthology.

== Background ==
Having returned to the UK from the United States in August 1976, Slade found themselves out-of-favour at the time of the UK's Punk rock explosion. The band's 1977 album Whatever Happened to Slade proved a commercial failure while their tour that spring had shown that they could no longer fill large venues. Slade's waning success soon led to the band playing small gigs after that, including universities and clubs. Despite being successful at filling small venues for their live performances, the band's new records were barely selling. After the commercial failure of the band's 1979 album Return to Base and 1980 EP Six of the Best, the band were on the verge of disbanding. The band's fortunes changed after they were offered a headlining slot at the Reading festival in August 1980, following a late cancellation by Ozzy Osbourne. The band's performance in front of the 65,000-strong crowd was a triumph and the band found themselves back in the public eye. The music press began to take an interest in the band again, while heavy metal followers also began deeming the band 'cool'.

Slade's entire performance at the festival was recorded by BBC and forty-five minutes of their set was soon broadcast on the Friday Rock Show. In order to capitalise on their new-found success, and in response to the many requests made for a Reading-related release, the band decided to release the Alive at Reading EP. A deal was struck between the BBC and the band for use of the tracks. Released in October 1980, the EP reached No. 44 in the UK, giving the band their first chart action since 1977. Both this EP and its November follow-up, Xmas Ear Bender, along with the Polydor compilation Slade Smashes! continued public interest in the band, allowing them time to plan their next steps for 1981. The band would return to the UK Top Ten with "We'll Bring the House Down" in early 1981, while the album of the same name would also be a UK Top 30 success.

Alive at Reading was released on 7" vinyl in the UK only on Cheapskate. The EP featured three songs from the Reading Festival. The first was the band's "When I'm Dancin' I Ain't Fightin'". The second was a cover of Steppenwolf's "Born to Be Wild", while the third was a medley of three tracks; "Somethin' Else, Pistol Packin' Mama, Keep a Rollin'". In the Netherlands, Three of the Best - Alive at Reading was released by WEA. It featured three songs from Six of the Best and all three songs from Alive at Reading.

In a 1980 fan club interview, lead vocalist Noddy Holder spoke of the EP:

"Well, it was just a matter of fact really. The BBC recorded the whole of the Reading Festival, we went down amazingly well. Tommy Vance played 40 minutes of our set on his show and got a fantastic response from it - thus it was public reaction really that prompted us to release something from the Reading Festival. You've seen the reaction on "When I'm Dancin' I Ain't Fightin'" now - when we first brought the track out on the "Six of the Best EP", it didn't see the light of day as far as charts were concerned - but now it's on the Reading EP and all the crowds are singing it! The turning point has been that we have been doing our songs in a live manner - and it seems to be working. I don't know whether it's good or bad that we have to do this, but the live thing has always been our main strong-point. "Get Down and Get With It" was our first hit because it had basically a live feel to it, the same applies to "When I'm Dancin' I Ain't Fightin'" from Reading."

In a 1986 fan club interview, guitarist Dave Hill described his experience of the Reading Festival:

"One heck of an experience, 'cos I wasn't going to do that gig. Slade manager Chas Chandler talked me into it, which I will always say was one of the best things he ever did for me. I thought we were going to get booed off. I remember Tommy Vance came into the dressing room and said "You're going to go down great". We said, "Well we hope to do okay", 'cos we're not the sort of band that pre-judges things, although we do have an inner confidence in ourselves. We walked on stage and there was this roar from the crowd. I thought "that's pretty good". We went into the first number and I could see the reporters looking at us. I was dreading the end of the first number, as that is the point at which we can usually tell how a show is going to go. As it happens, I think we went straight into "My Baby Left Me", so we didn't really wait or a reaction. The confidence came when there was a reaction, as it built and built, sort of got bigger and bigger. I could see Chas at the side grinning."

== Track listing ==
1. "When I'm Dancin' I Ain't Fightin'" - 3:58 (Noddy Holder, Jim Lea)
2. "Born to Be Wild" - 2:58 (Mars Bonfire)
3. "Somethin' Else, Pistol Packin' Mama, Keep a Rollin'" - 6:15 (Bob Cochran, Sharon Sheeley, Al Dexter, Slade)

== Critical reception ==
Upon release, Sounds said: "Aaah... now you're talking. Slade were the best out and out pop band of them all, bar none. They show they can still get a few asses wiggling with these three cuts from Reading, where they wiped the floor with Whitesnake, UFO et all by all accounts." In a Sounds article from November, the magazine said the EP "deserves your attention." They also described "When I'm Dancin' I Ain't Fightin'" as "smashing sledgehammer pop in the grand old tradition."

== Personnel ==
Slade

- Noddy Holder - lead vocals, guitar, producer, mixing
- Dave Hill - lead guitar, backing vocals, producer, mixing
- Jim Lea - bass, backing vocals, producer, mixing
- Don Powell - drums, producer, mixing

Additional personnel

- Mike "Mad Robbo" Robinson - mixing
- Tony Wilson, BBC - Many thanks to

== Charts ==
| Chart (1980) | Peak position |
|---|---|
| UK Singles (OCC) | 44 |
| UK The Singles Chart (Record Business) | 41 |
