= We'll Bring the House Down (song) =

- UK cover of "We'll Bring the House Down".

Single by Slade

from the album We'll Bring the House Down
- B-side: "Hold On to Your Hats"
- Released: 23 January 1981
- Genre: Heavy metal
- Length: 3:32
- Label: Cheapskate
- Songwriters: Noddy Holder; Jim Lea
- Producer: Slade

Slade singles chronology
| "Xmas Ear Bender" (1980) | "We'll Bring the House Down" (1981) | "Wheels Ain't Coming Down" (1981) |

Audio sample
- file; help

Alternative Cover
- German cover of "We'll Bring the House Down".

"We'll Bring the House Down" is a song by the British rock band Slade, released on 23 January 1981 as the lead single from their ninth studio album, We'll Bring the House Down. It was written by lead vocalist Noddy Holder and bassist Jim Lea, and produced by Slade. The band's first single to reach the UK Top 40 since 1977, the song peaked at No. 10 in the UK, remaining in the chart for nine weeks.

== Background ==
Having suffered from low popularity and a lack of chart action in the UK since 1976, Slade's fortunes changed when they were offered a headlining slot at the Reading Festival in August 1980, following a late cancellation by Ozzy Osbourne. The band's performance saw the music press begin to take an interest in them again, while heavy metal followers also began deeming the band 'cool'. The band's extended play Alive at Reading was released soon after, giving the band their first chart action since 1977, while the compilation Slade Smashes! was a big success. For their next single release, the band recorded "We'll Bring the House Down" in January 1981. A successful comeback single, it reached No. 10 in the UK, with the album of the same name following in March.

The idea for "We'll Bring the House Down" originally developed with the song's chant. At one of the band's post-Reading shows, the audience began repeating the chant. Backstage, Lea realised its potential and soon wrote the tune to the song. It was recorded over two days in January 1981 at Portland Studios in London. To give the song a bigger, distinctive sound, some parts of the song was recorded in the men's toilets, most notably the drums. In a 1984 interview with Record Mirror, Lea spoke of the song: "The crowd were chanting this "woh oh oh oh oh" and there was a big argument going on in the dressing room. Our manager Chas Chandler was going "You've got to go on otherwise there's going to be a riot!!". We looked through the curtain and all the gear had been packed away and they're going "woh oh oh oh oh" and I thought there's got to be a song in that – it's great."

In a 1981 fan club interview, drummer Don Powell spoke of the song's success: "The thing is we don't think of it as a comeback just because "We'll Bring the House Down" made the charts. We didn't really think how long it had been since we had a hit until "We'll Bring the House Down" charted, and then everyone told us that it was amazingly our first hit for four or five years, and we realised."

Later in March 1992, the band entered Rich Bitch Studios to record a new version of "We'll Bring the House Down". It was the band's final recording session and by the end of the month, Holder had left the band. The recording, later described by Lea as a "house/dance-style version" of the song, was never released.

== Release ==
"We'll Bring the House Down" was released on 7" vinyl by Cheapskate in the UK, Ireland, Germany and Spain. In Australia and New Zealand, it was released by RCA Victor. For the UK and Irish release, the B-side was "Hold on to Your Hats". For the remainder of releases, the single featured "Wheels Ain't Coming Down" as the B-side. Both tracks were taken from the band's 1979 album Return to Base and would also appear on We'll Bring the House Down.

== Promotion ==
A music video was filmed to promote the single, which was directed by Eric Boliski. It was filmed before and during the band's concert at the Gaumont Theatre in Ipswich on 17 January.

In the UK, the band performed the song on the music show Top of the Pops and ITV's Moondogs. In Germany, they performed it on the TV show Musikladen. BBC radio DJ/presenter Mike Read noted the band's "electrifying" performance with the song on Top of the Pops.

== Critical reception ==
Upon its release, Betty Page, writing for Sounds, commented, "Stick down some rock-hard Glamboy drums, swinging schlocko guitar which outcrasses Fatty Jones and a little spicy chant-a-long-a-football terrace toon and who can fail? Slade's current resurgence amongst the anti-literati seems to have provided a much-needed livener which has lifted years off their shoulders." Mike Gardner of Record Mirror felt Slade had "blown the impetus they've gained over the past eight weeks" by releasing a "messy 'live'-orientated song with a muddy production that does little to explain to others what all the fuss is about with this 'revival'". He added, "How about re-releasing 'When I'm Dancin' I Ain't Fightin', lads?" Paul Du Noyer of NME remarked it was "nice to see the up-turn in Slade's fortunes which followed Reading", but felt it was "a shame it's taken such a rotten, clumsy HM to do the trick". He continued, "[It] should pander to the band's new headbanger following alright, but frankly hasn't got much going for it. A crass echo of former glories."

In a retrospective review of the We'll Bring the House Down album, Geoff Ginsberg of AllMusic commented, "The title track is automatic. One listen and you'll be chanting along, just as Slade audiences did ever since the band started playing the song. An absolute must-hear."

== Formats ==
7" Single (UK release)

1. "We'll Bring the House Down" – 3:32
2. "Hold on to Your Hats" – 2:33

7" Single

1. "We'll Bring the House Down" – 3:32
2. "Wheels Ain't Coming Down" – 3:36

== Cover versions ==
- In 1990, Lea released his own version of the song as a single under the pseudonym The Clout. The version sampled the chant from Slade's original version and also featured female vocals by ex-Shakatak singer Jackie Rawe.

== Personnel ==
- Noddy Holder - lead vocals, guitar, producer, arranger
- Dave Hill - lead guitar, backing vocals, producer, arranger
- Jim Lea - bass, backing vocals, producer, arranger
- Don Powell - drums, producer, arranger

== Charts ==
| Chart (1981) | Peak position |
|---|---|
| Ireland (IRMA) | 11 |
| UK Singles (OCC) | 10 |
| UK Top 100 Singles (Record Business) | 11 |
