= Sign of the Times (Slade song) =

Single by Slade

from the album Return to Base
- B-side: "Not Tonight Josephine"
- Released: 26 October 1979
- Genre: Rock
- Length: 3:57
- Label: Barn
- Songwriter(s): Noddy Holder, Jim Lea
- Producer(s): Slade

Slade singles chronology
"Ginny, Ginny" (1979)	"Sign of the Times" (1979)	"Okey Cokey" (1979)

"Sign of the Times" is a song by the British rock band Slade, released in 1979 as the second single from the band's eighth studio album Return to Base. It was written by lead vocalist Noddy Holder and bassist Jim Lea, and produced by Slade.

== Background ==
Having returned to the UK from the United States in 1976, Slade found themselves out-of-favour at the time of the UK's Punk rock explosion. The band's 1977 album Whatever Happened to Slade proved a commercial failure while their tour that spring had shown that they could no longer fill large venues. Slade's waning success soon led to the band playing small gigs after that, including universities and clubs. Despite being successful at filling small venues for their live performances, the band's new records were barely selling. In May 1979, "Ginny, Ginny", the first single from the band's upcoming album Return to Base, failed to chart.

Deciding that a second single would be released from the album, the band were initially unsure of which track to release. When rough copies of Return to Base were sent to a number of European record labels, each had different thoughts on what song they believed to be a good contender. "Sign of the Times" was eventually chosen and released in October. However, the single failed to chart. In a 1981 fan club interview, lead vocalist Noddy Holder said: "We released things like "Sign of the Times" as an A-side single but it was withdrawn after only a week as we decided that we didn't want it out as most of the radio stations refused to play it. It only sold a few hundred copies." He also described the song as "acoustic rock".

"Sign of the Times" speaks of the approaching end of the 1970s and the 20th century, including the technological advances seen from the mid-20th century onwards, such as the invention of Supersonic aircraft, the Apollo 11 Moon landing, test tube babies and the rising of the computer age. A reference is also made to the fictional character Big Brother of George Orwell's novel Nineteen Eighty-Four. The song was recorded and mixed at Portland Studios. The title of Return to Base was taken from one of the song's lines. In a 1979 fan club interview, Hill explained: "We had a whole list of suggestions for the title, and Return to Base is the one we eventually decided upon." When asked why the song hadn't been included on the band's October tour, Hill revealed: "The reason for that is that at the moment we feel the act is just about right. We have added two numbers that have worked very well, and we are now hoping to get "Sign of the Times" in on the next stretch of dates. Also at the moment we've got one slow ballad in the act, and on this tour we didn't want to have two."

== Release ==
"Sign of the Times" was released on 7" vinyl by Barn in the UK only. It was marketed and distributed by Pinnacle, and released in a generic Barn sleeve. The B-side, "Not Tonight Josephine" was originally exclusive to the single, but would re-appear as the B-side to the band's 1981 single "Wheels Ain't Coming Down". It was later included on the band's 2007 compilation B-Sides. "Sign of the Times" was one of the last singles to be released on the Barn label, which was discontinued in 1980. "Sign of the Times" later re-appeared as the B-side to the band's 1981 UK hit single "Lock Up Your Daughters". The song was included on Salvo's 2006 box-set The Slade Box, as well as the 2007 remaster of We'll Bring the House Down.

== Formats ==
7" Single

1. "Sign of the Times" – 3:57
2. "Not Tonight Josephine" – 3:03

== Critical reception ==
Upon release, Melody Maker reviewed the single and said: "Poor old Slade. Banished by the fickle finger of public taste, they've been hovering in a sort of no-man's land for ages. This one won't recapture an audience, even though they're clearly aiming for the ELO sector. Echoed vocals, lots of bombast and the odd "electronic" gimmick do not make a great single. Only when Noddy Holder recaptures his perfect John Lennon imitation will they rise from the ashes..." Superpop rated the single two out of five stars and wrote: "I never was one for the rantings and ravings of Noddy Holder & Co. and this latest 45 doesn't do much to change my attitude. Starting slowly and building up to the usual foot-stomping, heavy head banging climax; it's sure to go down well in the Northern clubs where the band have a fervent following. I'd hate to think what the Southern crowds would say to this dated sound." Record Mirror commented: "On a recent trip to a Buzzocks gig I had the misfortune to be half-deafened by a vintage Slade album blasting from the four corners of their transit vehicle. I was expecting this to suddenly perk up but it's laid back intro remains such with vocals and guitar maintaining a pace of unashamed politeness. Just shows eh…even Slade mellow with age."

In a review of Return to Base, James Parade said: "I accept that Slade are not the most intelligent of men but then that's not what I demand from my pop stars, but I do expect a little more than references to Big brother, Stereo, Radio etc, in the otherwise catchy 'Sign of the Times'". In the 2007 Salvo remaster liner notes for We'll Bring the House Down, writer Chris Ingham said: "Of the lighter brand tracks on the album, "Sign of the Times" meditates on the technological revolution amidst rich chords and surprising key changes."

== Personnel ==
Slade

- Noddy Holder - lead vocals, guitar, producer, arranger
- Dave Hill - lead guitar, backing vocals, producer, arranger
- Jim Lea - bass, backing vocals, producer, arranger
- Don Powell - drums, producer, arranger

Additional personnel

- Andy Miller – engineer
- Dave Garland, Mark O'Donoughue – assistant engineers
- George Peckham – cutting engineer
