= My Baby Left Me =

1950 song by Arthur Crudup

"My Baby Left Me" is a rhythm and blues song written by blues singer Arthur Crudup.

== Original recording ==
The song was first recorded by Crudup in Chicago on November 8, 1950, with Ransom Knowling on bass and Judge Riley on drums, and was released as a single on RCA Victor 22–0109.

== Later versions ==
It gained further exposure in covers by Elvis Presley, who put his version on the B-side to his 1956 single "I Want You, I Need You, I Love You"; by Wanda Jackson who often shared the same bill as Presley; by Creedence Clearwater Revival, who recorded it as a track on their 1970 album, Cosmo's Factory; by Buffy Sainte-Marie on her 1972 album Moonshot; and by John Lennon (incorrectly titled "Since My Baby Left Me"), recorded during the Rock 'n' Roll sessions in 1973, but first released posthumously on Menlove Ave. in 1986. It was included as a bonus track (still incorrectly titled) on the 2004 CD version of Rock 'n' Roll. It was also a No. 37 UK Singles Chart hit in 1964 for Dave Berry. Elton John used a snippet of "My Baby Left Me" as part of a medley (along with a snippet of the Beatles' "Get Back") during his concert performance of "Burn Down the Mission" on his 17-11-70 live album. Loggins and Messina also covered this song on their 1975 album, So Fine. Andy Fairweather Low included his version of the song on his 2025 album, The Invisible Bluesman.

=== Slade version ===
"My Baby Left Me/That's Alright Mama"

Single by Slade
- B-side: "O.H.M.S."
- Released: 14 October 1977
- Recorded: 1977
- Genre: Rock
- Length: 2:24
- Label: Barn
- Songwriter: Arthur Crudup
- Producer: Chas Chandler

Slade singles chronology
"Burning in the Heat of Love" (1977)	"My Baby Left Me/That's Alright Mama" (1977)	"Give Us a Goal" (1978)

"My Baby Left Me" was covered by the British rock band Slade in 1977 and released as a non-album single as a tribute to Elvis Presley, who died in August of that year. The Slade version merged "My Baby Left Me" with "That's All Right", another Crudup-penned track. "My Baby Left Me But That's Alright Mama" reached No. 32 in the UK and remained in the charts for four weeks.

==== Background ====
Returning to the UK from the United States in August 1976, Slade found themselves out-of-favour at the time of the UK's punk rock explosion. The band's 1977 album Whatever Happened to Slade proved a commercial failure while their tour that spring had shown that they could no longer fill large venues. Although their April 1977 single "Burning in the Heat of Love" also failed to chart, the band returned to the Top 40 with "My Baby Left Me". Released in November 1977, it reached No. 32 and would be the band's last Top 40 single until 1981's "We'll Bring the House Down".

"My Baby Left Me" was recorded in August at Advision Studios in London. The band decided to record the song as a tribute to Elvis Presley following his death earlier that month. As guitarist Dave Hill was busy doing interviews in northern England, bassist Jim Lea played guitar on the recording. "My Baby Left Me" was released on 7" vinyl by Barn Records in the UK, Ireland, Belgium, France and Germany. The B-side, "O.H.M.S.", was exclusive to the single and would later appear on the band's 2007 compilation B-Sides. Noddy Holder told Record Mirror in 1977 that the song is "all about the [UK] tax system and the homesick exiles".

A music video was filmed to promote the single, featuring the band performing on a stage. In the UK, the band performed the song on the music show Top of the Pops. In Germany, it was performed on the TV shows Disco and Rund.

==== Critical reception ====
Upon its release, Tony Mitchell of Sounds picked "My Baby Left Me/That's Alright Mama" as "Best Comeback Single" and described it as a "fabulous treatment of this old Arthur Crudup number" which "could easily see Slade back in the charts". He continued, "It's a bouncy, struttin' 12-bar blues quite unlike most of the band's earlier hit singles and it could just be the right thing to get them back into favour at the current time." Charles Shaar Murray of the NME called it a "determinedly hard-assed medley of Crudup's greatest hits". Ken Lawrence of the Sports Argus praised it as a "fine rocker", with Slade "back in the old routine [with] a surefire hit". Barry Cain of Record Mirror considered Slade's version to be "real pleasant", but added, "I can remember a time when Slade records were vixen fearsome rather than pleasant. Fearsome on their own songs, not some cruising rocker from what back. Get out while the going's bad, 'cos it's only going to get hideous." Ian Birch of Melody Maker said the single "won't clinch it" in Slade's "struggle for re-acceptance" as they "knit two Crudup classics in flat fashion".

==== Track listing ====
7" single

1. "My Baby Left Me/That's Alright Mama" – 2:23
2. "O.H.M.S." – 2:41

==== Personnel ====
Slade

- Noddy Holder – lead vocals, guitar
- Jim Lea – guitar, bass, backing vocals
- Don Powell – drums

Additional personnel

- Chas Chandler – producer
- Gered Mankowitz – sleeve photography
- Jo Mirowski – sleeve design

==== Charts ====
Chart (1977)	Peak position
UK Singles Chart	32
