= Wheels Ain't Coming Down =

Single by Slade

from the album We'll Bring the House Down
- B-side: "Not Tonight Josephine"
- Released: 27 March 1981
- Recorded: 1979
- Genre: Rock
- Length: 3:37
- Label: Cheapskate
- Songwriters: Noddy Holder; Jim Lea
- Producer: Slade

Slade singles chronology
"We'll Bring The House Down" (1981)	"Wheels Ain't Coming Down" (1981)	"Knuckle Sandwich Nancy" (1981)

Audio sample
- file; help

"Wheels Ain't Coming Down" is a song by the British rock band Slade, released in 1979 as the opening track from their eighth studio album Return to Base. The song was written by lead vocalist Noddy Holder and bassist Jim Lea, and produced by Slade. In 1981, the song re-appeared on the band's follow-up album We'll Bring the House Down and was released as the second single from it on 27 March, which reached No. 60 in the UK.

== Background ==
"Wheels Ain't Coming Down" was released as the opening track on Return to Base, which was a commercial failure in 1979; a period when the band's popularity was low. The song also appeared on the 1980 extended play Six of the Best, which also failed to chart. In 1980, the band's fortunes were revived after a performance at Reading Festival. To capitalise on the new interest in the band, the album We'll Bring the House Down was released in March 1981, which featured a number of tracks re-used from Return to Base, including "Wheels Ain't Coming Down". Following up the Top Ten hit "We'll Bring the House Down", the band decided to release "Wheels Ain't Coming Down" as a single in March 1981. It reached No. 60, lasting three weeks on the chart.

"Wheels Ain't Coming Down" tells the tale of a near-death flying experience suffered by Holder and Lea when travelling to Los Angeles. In a 1981 interview with Daily Star, Holder recalled: "Jim and I were on the way to a radio station when the captain told us he could not get the wheels down to land. We were diverted to another airport for a crash landing. It's not a great feeling knowing you might have only 45 minutes left in life. We drank all the booze there was going. Happily the pilot brought the plane down safely."

== Release ==
"Wheels Ain't Coming Down" was released on 7" vinyl by Cheapskate in the UK only. The first 20,000 copies of the single were issued with a picture sleeve. The B-side, "Not Tonight Josephine", was previously the B-side to the 1979 single "Sign of the Times".

== Music video ==
A music video was filmed, however it was never shown at the time of single's release. It was directed by Eric Boliski. The video was filmed on the afternoon of 10 March 1981 at the Southampton Gaumont, prior to the band's concert there that evening. Fans of the band first saw the video on a bootleg DVD that was produced as part of the 'One More Time' DVD. Uber fans Mark Richards and Steve Knight forwarded the Video tape on to Slade In England where David Graham re edited and cleaned up the VHS tape. A DVD was produced and distributed amongst those Slade fans in the know.

== Critical reception ==
In a review of Return to Base, Wolverhampton Express and Star described "Wheels Ain't Coming Down" as a "power-packed churning song with a catchy hook line". Geoff Ginsberg of AllMusic retrospectively ranked the song among the band's best work and described it as "infectious to the degree that humming [it] could become a chronic problem".

Upon its release as a single in 1981, James Johnson, writing for the Daily Mirror, considered it "another blockbuster from Slade" and added, "It looks like their comeback is not just a brief return to glory." Jim Whiteford of The Kilmarnock Standard described it as a "fairly subdued rocker telling the story of a 'near thing' when the undercarriage of their jet jammed" and believed it would reach the top 30.

Simon Tebbutt of Record Mirror noted that "you wouldn't know it was Slade if it wasn't for the chorus" due to an "uncharacteristic musical sophistication" and considered the subject matter to be a "funny sort of thing to sing about really". He concluded, "Slade might be able to bring the house down, but they're a bit stuck when it comes to flying on a plane when the wheels won't come down. Anyway, keep your head low because if this one lands it might bring all the houses down." Betty Page of Sounds felt the song was both "nowhere near the rebel-rousin' quality" of "We'll Bring the House Down" and a "blatant rip-off" of the Edgar Winter Group's "Free Ride". She continued, "Glossy Americanised heaviness and a smooth Holder vocal distinctly lacking in raucous glambamming." Paul Du Noyer of NME was negative in his review, writing, "Dull, heavy-handed melodrama, follow-up to the surprise success of 'We'll Bore Your Pants Off'. Lots of whizz-bang sound effects but precious little inspiration. Hard work."

== Track listing ==
7-inch single

1. "Wheels Ain't Coming Down" – 3:37
2. "Not Tonight Josephine" – 3:03

== Personnel ==
- Noddy Holder – lead vocals, rhythm guitar, producer, arranger
- Dave Hill – lead guitar, backing vocals, producer, arranger
- Jim Lea – bass, backing vocals, producer, arranger
- Don Powell – drums, producer, arranger

== Charts ==
Chart (1981)	Peak position
UK Singles Chart (OCC)	60
UK Top 100 Singles (Record Business)	51
