= Return to Base =

Studio album by Slade
- Released: 1 October 1979
- Recorded: 1979
- Genre: Hard rock
- Length: 33:48
- Label: Barn
- Producer: Slade

Slade chronology
Slade Alive, Vol. 2 (1978)	Return to Base (1979)	Slade Smashes! (1980)

Singles from Return to Base
- 1. "Ginny, Ginny" Released: 18 May 1979; 2. "Sign of the Times (UK only)" Released: October 1979; 3. "I'm a Rocker (Belgium only)" Released: 12 March 1980

Return to Base is the eighth studio album by the British rock group Slade. It was released on 1 October 1979 by Barn Records, and did not enter any national album charts. At the time of the album's release, the band's success had waned and were receiving little fortune. Forced to play at small halls and clubs around the UK, the only income they were reliant on was Noddy Holder and Jim Lea's songwriting royalties. Their recent singles had sold poorly and they were no longer drawing in large audiences. Prior to their last-minute call up for the 1980 Reading Festival, they were on the verge of disbanding.

The band's previous album, Whatever Happened to Slade (1977), featured a "straight" hard rock sound, dropping the band's glam rock image, and despite critical acclaim, had brought the band little commercial fortune. Return to Base was conceived as a continuation of the band's sound, and an attempt to raise the band's fortune. The band aimed to record twenty songs, with the best eleven being put onto the album. In the 1979 July–August fan club magazine, drummer Don Powell confirmed that seventeen tracks had been recorded at the time. However, while the critical reaction to the album was generally positive, the album sold poorly, something partially blamed on Barn Records, who only pressed a total 3,500 copies of the album's lead single "Ginny, Ginny", virtually guaranteeing its failure to enter the charts. Even the single that followed, "Sign of the Times", failed to chart and most copies which were left were melted down.

Some of the tracks from Return to Base re-appeared on Slade's 1981 album We'll Bring the House Down, released following their successful appearance at the Reading Festival in 1980. The remainder tracks from Return to Base were included as bonus tracks on the 2007 "Feel the Noize" remaster of We'll Bring The House Down. As such, the album was the band's only album not to be included in the series of remastered releases.

== Background ==
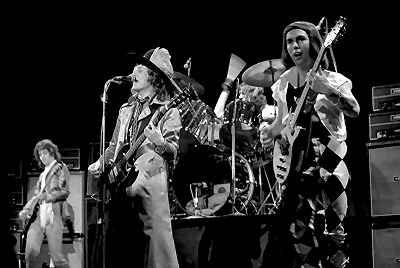
Slade performing live in 1977.

Having returned to the UK from the United States in August 1976, Slade found themselves out-of-favour at the time of the UK's Punk rock explosion. The band's 1977 album Whatever Happened to Slade proved a commercial failure while their tour that spring had shown that they could no longer fill large venues. Slade's waning success soon led to the band taking any gig they could. They found themselves playing small venues, mainly universities and clubs. The band's tours often ran at a loss, with the band having to bring their own PA and lightshow. Bassist Jim Lea, however, was unfazed. "I still thought the band was great," he told Chris Charlesworth in 1983, "We were playing as well if not better than we ever had... now we had something to prove again."

Despite being successful at filling small venues for their live performances, the band's new records were barely selling. With the band's new output no longer being released on Polydor Records but instead on manager Chas Chandlers' label Barn records, singles such as "Burning in the Heat of Love", "Give Us a Goal", "Rock 'n' Roll Bolero" and "Ginny, Ginny" were all chart failures. Even the band's second live album Slade Alive, Vol. 2 (1978), the sequel to their critically acclaimed and commercially successful Slade Alive! (1972), was a commercial failure.

== Recording ==
The album was recorded over a period of six weeks in 1979. The album saw the band produce together for the first time. In a 1979 fan club interview, Hill said: "We each took it in turn to produce certain parts ourselves – which makes it the first album we have solely produced ourselves."

"Jim was becoming more and more involved in that side of things. He wanted to produce the group and he didn't think that Chas was coming up with the goods."

— Noddy Holder discussing their decision to produce the album alone.

Disagreements between the group – especially Lea and their producer/manager Chas Chandler – had been brewing since the recording of Whatever Happened to Slade, and, having continued throughout 1978, came to a head during the recording sessions for Return to Base. "Jim was becoming more and more involved in that side of things," lead vocalist Noddy Holder told Chris Charlesworth. "He wanted to produce the group and he didn't think that Chas was coming up with the goods." Chandler, for his part, was unimpressed with the group's current material: "They felt that a great sound was the all important thing," he told Charlesworth. "I've always felt that the song comes first and you craft your sound to suit the song... not the other way round." Although Chandler offered to end his association with Slade altogether, the band asked him to remain as manager while they produced themselves. Chandler said: "I agreed to this because if I refused I felt I would have been kicking them when they were down."

Asked in 1979 for his thoughts on the album, Hill said: "I'm very satisfied with it. It's got a mixture of different types of songs on it, all of which adds up to it being a good album! My favourites are the rock 'n' roll one "I'm a Rocker" and the instrumental one "Lemme Love into Ya" – probably because of the way that they come over on stage more than anything else."

In a 1980 fan club interview, Holder spoke of the album. "Over the last couple of years me and Jim have been writing a lot of songs, but we haven't known which way to approach them really. With Return to Base we were really pleased with the album, we thought that it turned out really well, but it didn't sell. Everyone around the band was saying to us that we weren't coming up with as good songs as we used to, but me and Jim knew that we were, we knew that we were coming up with strong songs. Some of the songs on Return to Base we thought were some of the best songs that we'd ever written. There only seemed to be me and Jim that had confidence in the songs; people like Chas, Dave and Don said that they didn't think our songs were as strong, some of them they did but some of them they didn't. But we ourselves thought that they were. Thus it was a case of getting the album down; and in our minds it turned out to be a great album."

During the recording of Return to Base, Slade were persuaded by engineer Andy Miller to record a song he had co-wrote with Bernie Frost. The song, "Another Win", recorded by Slade but was not released. In 2011, the song emerged on the internet through the Slade in England website.

== Music ==
"Ginny, Ginny"
The album's unsuccessful lead single, "Ginny, Ginny", was described by band member Jim Lea as being "very catchy".

"Sign of the Times"
"Sign of the Times" is a ballad about technological revolution. It was released as a single but failed to chart.

"Wheels Ain't Coming Down"
The opening track, "Wheels Ain't Coming Down", tells the tale of a near-death flying experience in Los Angeles involving band members Noddy Holder and Jim Lea. It was released as a modest hit single in 1981.

As the album title suggested, the album continues the "back to basics" sound of their previous album Whatever Happened to Slade (1977). AllMusic stated that "the sound of this record harkens back to the hit single sound, a bit less overdriven and heavy, and a bit more hook-filled and light. Acoustic guitars even appear at times."

=== Side one ===
"Wheels Ain't Coming Down" tells the tale of a near-death flying experience suffered by Holder and Lea when travelling to Los Angeles. The track was later released as a single in 1981 and peaked at No. 60. "Hold on to Your Hats" is a mid-tempo track influenced by a more rock 'n' roll sound. The track uses backward reverb effects and features a question and answer technique between Holder and the other band members Hill and Lea during the chorus. "Chakeeta" is a more commercial sounding track on the album. "Don't Waste Your Time (Back Seat Star)" is an acoustic-based ballad, described by Holder in 1988 as a "surrealistic social comment". "Sign of the Times" is a ballad based on technological revolution. Released as a single in its own right, which did not chart, it was later featured as the B-Side to Slade's 1981 hit single "Lock Up Your Daughters".

=== Side two ===
"I'm a Rocker" is a cover of the Chuck Berry track. To promote the album in Belgium, a Belgian film crew recorded the band performing the song at Portland Studios in London. The song was released as a single in Belgium in 1980, peaking at number one there. The song originally came to Holder's attention when it was played on Radio One by DJ Annie Nightingale. In a 1980 interview, Holder said: "I really liked it [and] mentioned to the others in the band that I'd heard a really great Chuck Berry number". After spending time trying to get hold of a copy of the song, Holder obtained the album of the same name from an import shop. Holder revealed: "After listening to it, we started to play it live on stage, first of all just as a jam at the end of the set. Then one night we went into the studio, we'd been all over the pub, and we had half an hour left at the end of a session, and we decided to record it, and we got it down in one take. The feel is there in that song, it's us, Slade – it's what we are all about."

"Nuts Bolts and Screws" is another rock-based track which AllMusic states ranks among the band's best work. "My Baby's Got It", is a track influenced by rock 'n' roll and boogie rock. "I'm Mad" is an acoustic-based track which portrays a man who is in thrall with his fantasies and dreams. Record Mirror stated that the song "is the nearest thing to a hit single with its jump along beat and pure sixties chord changes." "Lemme Love into Ya" is a minor-key ballad which became a regular inclusion in the band's live set-list. Record Mirror noted the song's "backwards tremeloed guitar intro" and "very ambient sound". The song was later re-worked into the song "Poland", which Lea recorded as a solo venture under the name Greenfields of Tong. His version was released as a single in 1982. "Lemme Love into Ya" was voted number two of the top three Slade album tracks in the Slade Fan Club Poll of 1979.

"Ginny, Ginny" was released in May of that year, vaguely feted as the lead single from the album (despite coming out five months in advance of the album itself). The single failed to chart; however, according to the official Slade fan club newsletter of the time, the track had entered the UK best sellers Top 200 chart. The song was originally named "Jeanie Jeanie" and was issued on a yellow vinyl as a single in hope of interesting buyers. Lea also recorded his own version of the song with his brother Frank as part of his side-project The Dummies. Recorded during 1979–80, it was later released in 1991 on A Day in the Life of the Dummies, an album that gathered The Dummies' recordings.

== Title and packaging ==
The album title is a line from the album's song "Sign of the Times". In response to how the album's title was decided, Hill said the band "had a whole list of suggestions for the title, and Return To Base is from one of the lines in the song "Sign of the Times". In the November–December 1979 fan club magazine, it was stated that the album's title also described the band's actions of the time. Both Lea and Hill lived in Wolverhampton while Holder and Powell lived in London. By the album's release, all members were living in Wolverhampton.

Dressed in a plain red sleeve with the stark black title in a battered typeface, the album cover was intended to reflect a no-nonsense, back-to-basics, "never-say-die" attitude, although it was noted that "it ended up looking as threadbare as much of the public assumed Slade to be." Upon asking if the album's artwork had been designed, Hill replied "It's still being done, but I understand that it is going to have a photo of a ticker-tape message on the front saying "Return To Base", in computer-like lettering. But it should be a very basic cover – so that it ties in with the "basic" reference in the title."

== Release ==
The album was released on their manager Chas Chandlers' label Barn Records on 1 October 1979 in the United Kingdom, over two and a half years since their previous studio release, Whatever Happened to Slade, which was their first album on the label.

=== Commercial performance ===
In the United Kingdom, the album continued the band's commercial failures, and found no audience other than the band's already existing fan base. As with their previous album Whatever Happened to Slade, the album did not enter the UK Albums Chart. Their seasonal party single "Okey Cokey", released in December 1979, also failed to enter the UK Singles Chart. A similar fate greeted the 12-inch extended play, Six of the Best, released in June 1980. The EP, priced at the cheap price of £1.49, contained three tracks from Return to Base and three new tracks.

The album saw success in Belgium in 1980, reaching No. 1 on the albums chart. As the album was not available in Belgium, fans in the country originally had to buy the album as an import. The album soon climbed to No. 1 on the Telemoustique chart, a weekly rock chart compiled by public votes. It also topped the Belgian radio station Impedance's daily chart on several occasions. As a result of the interest in the album, the album was released in the country by Warner Bros. in 1980. The album climbed to number one there, as did the Belgian-only single "I'm a Rocker.

In a 1980 fan club interview, Noddy Holder spoke of the success in Belgium: "What happened in Belgium was that Return to Base was available on import, and it started to climb the import charts. I don't know why, it was as much a surprise to us as it was to anybody. Warner Bros. Records then said to us, due to it starting to show some action, would we want to release it over there as a major release. We thought "why not?" – and now it's the number one album over there!" Speaking of "I'm a Rocker", Holder said: "That was the track getting the most airplay from the album. But it's not just a case of that applying in Belgium – we've had so many people writing to us asking why we've not released it as a single. "I'm a Rocker" is not even one of our songs though – it's a Chuck Berry number."

=== Initial critical reception ===
Professional ratings
Review scores
Source	Rating
Record Mirror	3/5 stars
Sounds	3/5 stars

Shortly before the release of the album, the Slade fan club newsletter editor Dave Kemp stated how he felt on the rough copy he had heard. "Having heard the rough copy of it, all I can say is that it's amazing, totally different to anything Slade have done before, you'll love it."

At the time of release, professional reviews were overall mixed. Record Mirror stated: "Assuming that the title should be taken to mean that the group are trying to visit the territorial war grounds of their golden years in the singles charts I reckon they are in for a shock. I expect a little more than references to Big Brother, Stereo, Radio etc, in the otherwise catchy "Sign of the Times" and the reflection of "Born to Run" in "Wheels Ain't Coming Down". On "Nuts Bolts & Screws" and "My Baby's Got It" Slade start to rock, but there's nothing here to distinguish them from any other rocking combo. I wasn't expecting another "Cum On Feel the Noize" or "My Friend Stan" but just something a little more inspired. From a new band this would be a fairly good debut, from Slade I want more." Sounds were similar in their reception, writing: "Slade have managed to pull a fair to impressive performance out of the bag with this one. Sure to new wave lugs it sounds dated, but Return to Base still rocks like a good un', utilising standard rock 'n' roll/hard rock foundations for commendable displays of tightness and old time rock bite. Noddy's got one of the all time classic rock voices as he belts through ten steamy originals and one Chuck Berry cover. Slade may have stood still, but their own brand of rock shout clout still sounds good to these biased ears." Max Bell of NME was negative in his review, remarking: "Slade always were a poor man's hard rock band, appealing to the worst boys-night-out instincts. In the days when bad glam rock was the British norm this sort of muck might have fitted the bill a treat, but in 1979 who wants to hear a bunch of pathetic old has-been Flash Harrys reiterating the limitations of their puerile sordid imaginations?"

A more positive review came from Wolverhampton Express and Star: "Slade haven't had a big hit for some time now, but it would be silly to write them off just yet, to judge by their new album Return to Base. There is definitely a Sixties feel to some of the songs, though others are vintage Slade. Most striking thing about the album is its variety, for Slade have loosened up a bit for this one and included much more variety of mood. It certainly pays off. Another striking factor is the guitar playing of Dave Hill, who has really been allowed to branch out on this disc. In all, it's an album which will please Slade's still huge army of fans, both for its fidelity to the Slade sound and for its inventiveness and freshness." In May 1980, Jon Young of New York magazine Trouser Press reviewed the album and stated: "On Return to Base, seven of the eleven cuts connect in every possible way, for a batting average of .636. If it had been released in 1973, the classic "Nuts, Bolts and Screws" would've easily topped the UK charts. Okay, there's nothing here quite as wonderful as "Cum On Feel the Noize". But whose fault is that? This kind of music isn't meant for a vacuum! It's meant to be enjoyed! Give Slade some encouragement! You will be glad that you did!!"

The album was voted No. 2 of the top three Slade albums in the Slade Fan Club Poll of 1979.

== Legacy and later reviews ==
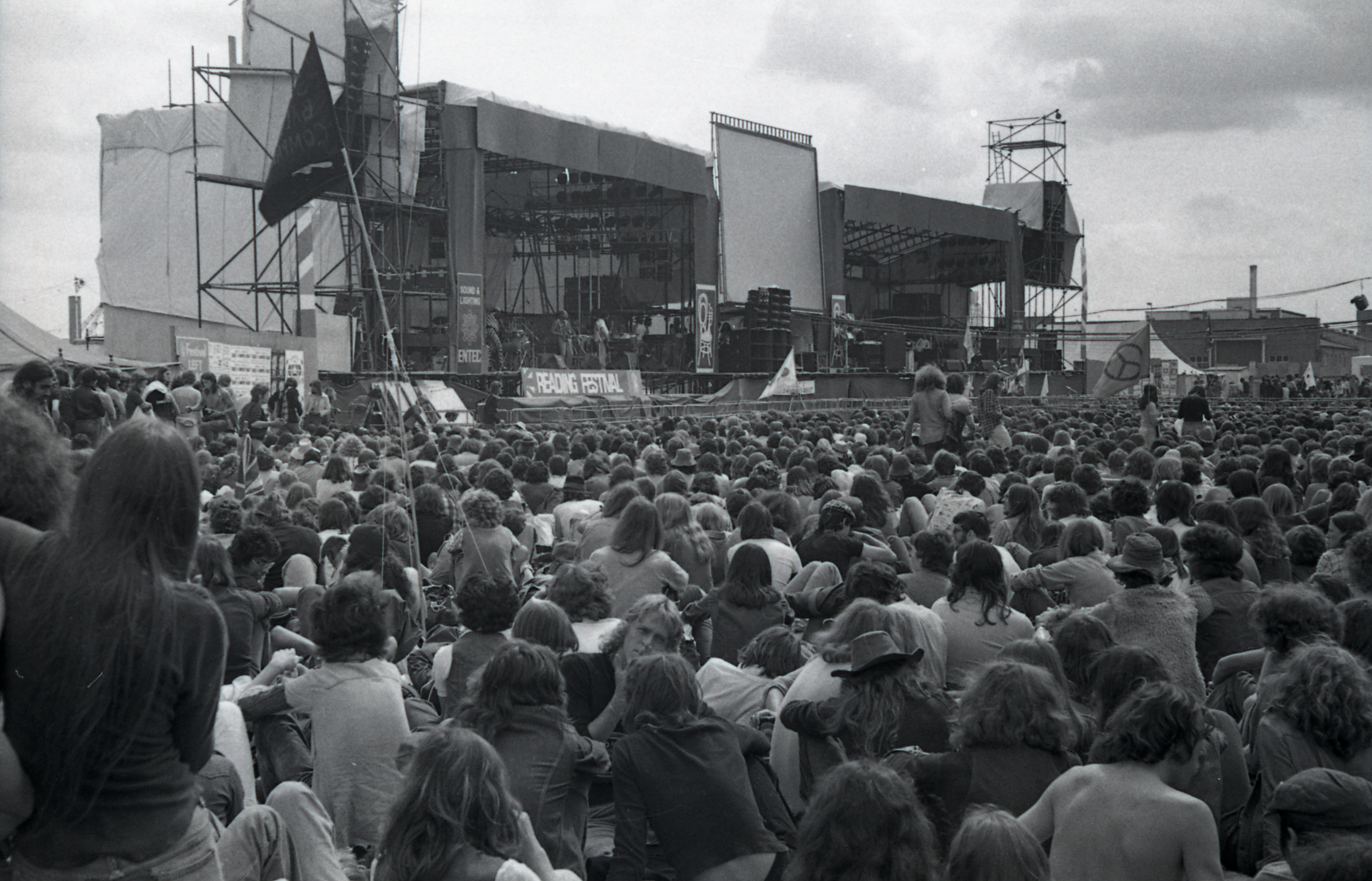
In 1980, the band performed at Reading Festival (pictured in 1974), reviving their career.

Professional ratings
Review scores
Source	Rating
AllMusic	2/5 stars
The Encyclopedia of Popular Music	2/5 stars

In mid-1980, by which point the band were on the verge of disbanding, the band were offered to appear at Reading Festival in August 1980 in a last minute call-up. The band only had a couple of their road crew to help them on the day. Jim Lea recalled "We had to pay to park in the public area. With no roadies, we had to carry our own gear and there was even trouble getting into the backstage area." Despite the failure of Return to Base and the band's lack of success, the performance at the festival was a success and the band became popular once again. As a result of this success, several tracks from the album which the band considered the strongest reappeared on the band's next album, We'll Bring the House Down (1981), which successfully rejuvenated the band's successes, both critically and commercially.

A retrospective review from AllMusic noted that Return to Base "marks Slade's low ebb in terms of popularity and morale", and were mixed in their reception to the album, rating it two stars out of five and noting the album was "certainly not a high point for the band, but they kept on keepin' on, no matter how bad things got. Secure in the knowledge that practically no one had ever heard the thing, Slade eventually redid the record as We'll Bring the House Down, a fully realized project." In early 2010, Classic Rock considered the album "superior, reputation cementing" and wrote: "We'll Bring the House Down was cobbled together quickly after the band's Reading triumph, largely from the contents of their previous (overlooked) album, Return to Base." Colin Harper of Record Collector said: "Searching for the UK zeitgeist, 1979's now abjectly obscure Return to Base ironically had a pleasingly diverse, reinvigorated musical palette."

The album was re-released on CD in Germany in 1997 by RCA and BMG, and was remastered for another CD release in Japan in 2006 by Air Mail Recordings in their Archive series as part of the band's band catalogue remasters there from the label. However, the album was not remastered for its own album release in 2007 for the UK "Feel the Noize: Slade Remastered" series unlike the rest of their studio albums. Instead, the songs from the album which did not also appear on We'll Bring This House Down (1981) were remastered as bonus tracks for that album's remaster. Thus Return to Base remains the only Slade album never released in the UK on CD, or re-released on any other format.

== Track listing ==
All tracks are written by Noddy Holder and Jim Lea, except "I'm a Rocker" by Chuck Berry.

Side one
No.	Title	Length
1.	"Wheels Ain't Coming Down"	3:40
2.	"Hold on to Your Hats"	2:32
3.	"Chakeeta"	2:26
4.	"Don't Waste Your Time (Back Seat Star)"	3:28
5.	"Sign of the Times"	3:57

Side two
No.	Title	Length
6.	"I'm a Rocker"	2:46
7.	"Nuts Bolts and Screws"	2:30
8.	"My Baby's Got It"	2:34
9.	"I'm Mad"	2:46
10.	"Lemme Love into Ya"	3:26
11.	"Ginny, Ginny"	3:38

== Charts ==
Chart (1980)	Peak position
Belgium Telemoustique Albums Chart	1

== Personnel ==
Slade

- Noddy Holder – lead vocals, rhythm guitar, producer
- Dave Hill – lead guitar, backing vocals, producer
- Jim Lea – bass, piano, synthesizer, backing vocals, producer
- Don Powell – drums, percussion, backing vocals, producer

Additional personnel

- Andy Miller – engineer
- Dave Garland, Mark O'Donoughue – assistant engineers
- George Peckham – cutting engineer
- Eric Massey – art direction
