= Ginny, Ginny =

Single by Slade

from the album Return to Base
- B-side: "Dizzy Mama"
- Released: 25 May 1979
- Genre: Rock
- Length: 3:39
- Label: Barn
- Songwriters: Noddy Holder; Jim Lea
- Producer: Slade

Slade singles chronology
| "Rock 'n' Roll Bolero" (1978) | "Ginny, Ginny" (1979) | "Sign of the Times" (1979) |

"Ginny, Ginny" is a song by English rock band Slade, released in 1979 as the lead single from their eighth studio album, Return to Base. It was written by lead vocalist Noddy Holder and bassist Jim Lea, and was produced by Slade. "Ginny, Ginny" failed to make an appearance in the UK Singles Chart.

== Background ==
"Ginny, Ginny" was released at a time when Slade, having returned to the UK from the United States in 1976, found themselves out of favour in the UK music scene, particularly with the explosion of punk rock. The single was another commercial disappointment and was Slade's fifth since 1976 not to enter the UK Singles Chart. However, despite its failure to reach the main top 75, the single did reach an unknown position within the full industry-only top 200, which was confirmed in the July–August 1979 issue of Slade News by the managing director of Barn Records, Mike Hales.

Prior to its release as a single, the band introduced the song into the setlist of their January–February 1979 UK tour, where it was introduced as "Ginny Come and Get It While You Can". In a 1979 fan club interview, Lea spoke of the upcoming single and the band's hopes it would return them to the charts, "It's very catchy, and we're going to make it, yeah! Our writing is returning to a more concise format. I mean, songs like 'Be' are hardly concise – they're clever, but hardly the sing-along down at the pub type song." In a 1979 fan club interview after the single's release, drummer Don Powell stated, "It didn't sell enough to get into the charts, but we were pleased with it."

The band's manager, Chas Chandler, told Music Week about the band's continued commercial woes, "We have tried to analyse what's right and what's wrong, but it's difficult. Their latest record ['Ginny, Ginny'] has had good reviews, but the radio stations won't play it. Perhaps surprisingly, there has even been a good disco reaction."

== Release ==
"Ginny, Ginny" was released in the UK by Barn, with distribution by Pinnacle, on yellow vinyl on 25 May 1979.

== Critical reception ==
Upon its release, Jon Savage of Melody Maker described "Ginny, Ginny" as a "heavyish pop song which is surprisingly emotional and individual". He added, "They've dropped the yobbish approach and gone back to that vaguely Lennonesque sound that used to stand them in good stead: if played, successful. A small pleasure." Rosalind Russell of Record Mirror wrote, "The climb back isn't going to be easy for Slade, but this might be a foothold on the bottom of the charts for them. Not the big one though, even if Nod has got a great voice." Paul Walker of the Sandwell Evening Mail remarked, "Still the same distinctive Noddy Holder voice, but not quite so fervent as before". Pat Stevens of the Nottingham Evening Post commented, "Some vague memories of the old Slade style can be noticed in this release, but it's not the same sort of searing quality that made them one of the top groups in the country a few years ago." Mike Pryce of the Worcester Evening News wrote, "I feel a bit sad for Slade because they've still got all the aggression that marked their halycon days, but the scene has passed on now and they're left singing all to themselves. Not even a pressing in yellow plastic will life this despite Noddy Holder singing as well as ever." Marc Lee of the Telegraph & Argus called it a "watered-down rocker" that is "unlikely to put them back on the road to success".

== Formats ==
7-inch single (UK and New Zealand)

1. "Ginny Ginny" – 3:50
2. "Dizzy Mama" – 3:57

== Personnel ==
Slade

- Noddy Holder – lead vocals, guitar
- Dave Hill – lead guitar, backing vocals
- Jim Lea – bass, backing vocals
- Don Powell – drums

Production

- Slade – production

== Cover versions ==
In circa 1980, Lea recorded a version of the song as part of his side project, The Dummies, with his brother Frank. It remained unreleased until its appearance on the album A Day in the Life of the Dummies in 1992, on which it had the title "Jeanie, Jeanie".
