= Slade Smashes! =

Slade Smashes

Compilation album by Slade
- Released: 1 November 1980
- Genre: Glam rock; hard rock
- Label: Polydor
- Producer: Chas Chandler

Slade chronology
Return to Base (1979)	Slade Smashes (1980)	We'll Bring the House Down (1981)

Slade Smashes is a compilation album by the British rock band Slade. It was released 1 November 1980 and reached No. 21 on the UK charts. The album was issued by Polydor in the wake of new interest in the band following their successful appearance at the 1980 Reading Festival, filling in for Ozzy Osbourne. The album featured most of the band's big hits from their early and mid 1970s heyday in the UK as well as three of the band's singles from post-1977. This collection, alongside the band's subsequent 1981 studio release We'll Bring the House Down, further cemented Slade's comeback in the UK and Europe.

The compilation was compiled by Polydor and has little input from the band. According to the Slade fan club, Polydor spent £250,000 on promotion of Slade Smashes!. The album was a success in the UK, reaching No. 21 and gaining a Gold certification in December for selling 200,000 copies.

In a 1980 fan club interview, lead vocalist Noddy Holder commented of the compilation's release: "It's not been the Reading Festival that has prompted the release of the album – they had already made plans to release the album before we decided to do the show. In a 1980 interview with Sounds, Holder further added: "This compilation will be great for the fans, a chance to get all the hits on one record. But we don't relate to them in the same way any more, the way we play them now is bugger all like the records anyway." Prior to the release of the album, all of the band's singles had been deleted except "Merry Xmas Everybody".

In December 1984, guitarist Dave Hill sold his own Slade Smashes! UK Gold Disc award for charity. It sold for £385 and was shown on the UK television show Saturday Starship.

== Track listing ==
All tracks are written by Noddy Holder and Jim Lea except "My Baby Left Me/That's Alright Mama (Medley)" by Arthur Crudup and "Get Down Get With" by Bobby Marchan.

Side one
No.	Title	Length
1.	"Cum on Feel the Noize"	4:24
2.	"My Friend Stan"	2:41
3.	"Far Far Away"	3:36
4.	"Coz I Luv You"	3:34
5.	"Everyday"	3:10
6.	"Gypsy Roadhog"	3:27
7.	"Thanks for the Memory (Wham Bam Thank You Mam)"	4:34
8.	"Bangin' Man"	4:09
9.	"In For a Penny"	3:36
10.	"Skweeze Me Pleeze Me"	4:32

Side two
No.	Title	Length
1.	"Mama Weer All Crazee Now"	3:44
2.	"Look Wot You Dun"	2:51
3.	"Take Me Bak 'Ome"	3:05
4.	"Let's Call It Quits"	3:32
5.	"Give Us a Goal"	2:49
6.	"Merry Xmas Everybody"	3:42
7.	"How Does It Feel?"	5:54
8.	"My Baby Left Me/That's Alright Mama (Medley)"	2:25
9.	"Get Down Get With It"	3:49
10.	"Gudbuy T'Jane"	3:31

== Critical reception ==
Professional ratings
Review scores
Source	Rating
AllMusic	4.5/5 stars
Sounds	5/5 stars
Record Mirror	4.5/5 stars

Upon release, Record Mirror wrote of the compilation: "Songs like "Mama Weer All Crazee Now", "Cum on Feel the Noize", "Take Me Bak 'Ome", "Gudbuy T'Jane" and the others contained on this 20 track precis of the time when Slade and the record buying public connected are the best reminders of the power some felt and others ignored. Those who have realised the power of Slade will already have the majority of the songs on this collection. Those who have only recently caught up will find this set a useful but ultimately unsatisfying reminder of the joy and exuberance of the Birmingham quartet. Those who have yet to find out had better start here and then grasp the opportunity to 'feel the noize' at the first chance." Sounds described the album as a "mighty meaty big and bouncy collection of twenty timeless Slade faves". They added: "This collection is a perfect reminder of the glories that were, marrying raucous rock and singalong pop in a superb celebration of unpretentious goodtimes. They're all here, the rowdy faultless chart-toppers."

== Personnel ==
Slade

- Noddy Holder – lead vocals, rhythm guitar
- Dave Hill – lead guitar, backing vocals
- Jim Lea – bass, piano, violin, backing vocals
- Don Powell – drums

Additional personnel

- Chas Chandler – producer

== Charts ==
Chart (1980–1981)	Peak position
Australian Albums (Kent Music Report)	48
UK Albums (OCC)	21

== Certifications ==
Region	Certification	Certified units/sales
United Kingdom (BPI)	Gold	100,000^{^}
^{^} Shipments figures based on certification alone.
