= Give Us a Goal =

Single by Slade
- B-side: "Daddio"
- Released: February 1978
- Genre: Hard rock
- Length: 2:49
- Label: Barn
- Songwriters: Noddy Holder; Jim Lea
- Producer: Chas Chandler

Slade singles chronology
"My Baby Left Me - That's All Right" (1977)	"Give Us a Goal" (1978)	"Rock 'n' Roll Bolero" (1978)

Audio sample
- file; help

"Give Us a Goal" is a song by English rock band Slade, released in 1978 as a non-album single. It was written by lead vocalist Noddy Holder and bassist Jim Lea, and was produced by Chas Chandler. A football-themed song, it failed to enter the UK Singles Chart but did reach number 62 in the Record Business Singles Chart and number 70 in Gallup's National Top 100 Singles chart.

In 2008, the song was used in a UK TV advert for the football video game Fifa 09.

== Background ==
When Lea presented the tune he had written, Holder suggested that the lyrics should have a football theme as many of the band's fans were also football supporters. In a 1991 interview for the video compilation Wall of Hits, Lea recalled, "I wrote this tune and Nod said 'Let's do one about football because we've always had this football following". I was never really convinced about doing a football song, nevertheless the video was fun." The song was recorded at Advision Studios in London in January–February 1978.

== Release ==
"Give Us a Goal" was released at a time when Slade, having returned to the UK from the United States in 1976, found themselves out of favour in the UK music scene, particularly with the explosion of punk rock. Although they scored a top 40 hit with "My Baby Left Me - That's All Right" in October 1977, the follow-up single, "Give Us a Goal", failed to enter the UK Singles Chart when released in February 1978. Despite missing the main charts, which were compiled by the British Market Research Bureau (BMRB) at the time, "Give Us a Goal" reached number 70 in chart compiler Gallup's National Top 100 Singles chart based on sales and also reached number 62 in the Record Business magazine's Singles Chart based on both sales and airplay.

== Music video ==
The song's music video was shot at Brighton & Hove Albion F.C.'s Goldstone Ground in Hove on 9 and 11 February 1978. It features the band performing the song in front of the team's supporters, interspersed with sequences of the band playing football with the team. The footage of the band playing football was shot on the first day of filming during one of the team's practice matches and the footage of the band performing the song was shot on the second day of filming prior to a home match. It was so cold during the shoot that the band struggled to play football on the first day and guitarist Dave Hill had to wear a woolly hat on the second.

The video was made by Jon Roseman Productions (produced by Paul Flattery). Roseman was an avid supporter of Brighton and determined that the video be shot there. When the band performed for the crowd, the reception was very hostile (as the band were Wolverhampton Wanderers' supporters), but because you never hear the crowd, the visuals made it look as if they were welcoming. For the other footage, the directors of the video insisted the film crew keep filming until one of the band members scored a goal against Brighton's goalkeeper. It took a long time for them to achieve this but eventually drummer Don Powell was successful. In 1991, Holder recalled, "We were actually playing with the Brighton team and they kicked the shit out of us. Alan Mullery was the manager at the time and he was shouting to the team from the sidelines, 'Let them have a kick!'. I had to take a penalty at one point and could I get the ball in the net? I must have tried ten times and in the end the goalie was rolling on the floor pissing himself laughing."

== Promotion ==
In addition to the music video, "Give Us a Goal" was promoted with adverts in music magazines, space in the football magazine Shoot, song sheets and giveaway whistles. The band also performed the song on the ITV children's television series Get It Together and the BBC children's game show Cheggers Plays Pop.

== Critical reception ==
Upon its release, Rosalind Russell of Record Mirror noted that "Give Us a Goal" has "plenty of guts, the typical rasping vocals, all that stuff, but it's missed the goal". She added, "I'd like to see the oldies make it again, I really would. I always loved their gigs, just for the atmosphere. I think that's what they must have been thinking about when they wrote this song, because it captures the football fervour they used to build up. That's why it's a bit sad, because I don't think it's worked. I think they're groping in the dark, looking backwards for their future." Anna Knop of The Dalkeith Advertiser commented it is "in the true Slade tradition – a stomping, catchy, loud number – and bound to be a hit". Mike Pryce of the Worcester Evening News wrote, "They're really trying. Everything's in there, including the kitchen sink and a road drill. Noddy Holder's still one of the best voices and it all goes back to the old Strangelove discs. Powerful stuff." Barry Myers of Sounds called it "dire" and remarked, "Slade in their heyday produced some very exciting pop, but with energy having become the catch-word of the New Wave they were unable to keep in step." He added that the song was "destined to be ripped off by the terrace choirs throughout Britain".

== Track listing ==
7-inch single (UK, France, Germany and Belgium)

1. "Give Us a Goal" – 2:49
2. "Daddio" – 2:30

== Personnel ==
Slade

- Noddy Holder – lead vocals, guitar
- Dave Hill – lead guitar, backing vocals
- Jim Lea – bass, backing vocals
- Don Powell – drums

Production

- Chas Chandler – production

== Charts ==
Chart (1978)	Peak position
UK The Singles Chart (Record Business)	62
UK National Top 100 Singles (Gallup)	70
