= Before We Were So Rudely Interrupted =

Studio album by the Original Animals
- Released: August 1977
- Recorded: November 1975 – September 1976
- Studio: Rolling Stones Mobile Studio, Goulds Farm
- Genre: Rock, blues rock, rhythm and blues
- Label: Barn (original); Jet/United Artists (USA)
- Producer: Chas Chandler

The Original Animals chronology
The Greatest Hits of Eric Burdon and the Animals (1969)	Before We Were So Rudely Interrupted (1977)	Ark (1983)

Professional ratings
Review scores
Source	Rating
AllMusic	4/5 stars
Christgau's Record Guide	B−
The Encyclopedia of Popular Music	1/5 stars
The Rolling Stone Album Guide	3.5/5 stars

Before We Were So Rudely Interrupted is a 1977 reunion album by the Animals. They are billed on the cover as the Original Animals.

== History ==
The album marked a reunion of the five original Animals from the group's first incarnation — Eric Burdon, Alan Price, Hilton Valentine, Chas Chandler, and John Steel, in their first recording sessions since 1965. Bassist Chandler produced the effort using his Barn Records team.

The title refers to the first sentence of William Connor's first column in the Daily Mirror after World War II: "As I was saying before I was so rudely interrupted ...".

The album was remastered and reissued on CD in 2000 by Repertoire Records.

== Reception ==
The album has received good critical notices. Rolling Stone writer Dave Marsh called it "a surprisingly successful [...] one-shot, with the original group, again dominated by Price and Burdon, turning in fine, hard-nosed blues performances." Bruce Eder of AllMusic judged it "just short of a lost classic."

However, record company promotion for the album was weak, no tour was held, and the sound was out of time with the popularity of disco and punk rock; it thus reached only No. 70 on the U.S. pop albums chart, No. 24 in Netherlands and did not chart at all in the UK.

== Track listing ==
=== Side one ===
1. "Brother Bill (The Last Clean Shirt)" (Jerry Leiber, Mike Stoller, Clyde Otis) – 3:18
2. "It's All Over Now, Baby Blue" (Bob Dylan) – 4:39
3. "Fire on the Sun" (Shakey Jake) – 2:23
4. "As the Crow Flies" (Tony Joe White) – 3:37
5. "Please Send Me Someone to Love" (Percy Mayfield) – 4:44

=== Side two ===
1. "Many Rivers to Cross" (Jimmy Cliff) – 4:06
2. "Just a Little Bit" (John Thornton, Ralph Bass, Earl Washington, Piney Brown) – 2:04
3. "Riverside County" (Eric Burdon, Alan Price, Hilton Valentine, Chas Chandler, John Steel) – 3:46
4. "Lonely Avenue" (Doc Pomus) – 5:16
5. "The Fool" (Naomi Ford, Lee Hazlewood) – 3:24

== Personnel ==
=== The Original Animals ===
- Eric Burdon – vocals
- Alan Price – keyboards
- Hilton Valentine – guitar
- Chas Chandler – bass
- John Steel – drums

=== Technical ===
- Alan O'Duffy – engineer
- Paul Hardiman – mix engineer
- Jo Mirowski – design
- Terry O'Neill – photography
