= Rock 'n' Roll Bolero =

Single by Slade
- B-side: "It's Alright Buy Me"
- Released: 6 October 1978
- Genre: Rock
- Length: 3:50
- Label: Barn
- Songwriters: Noddy Holder; Jim Lea
- Producer: Slade

Slade singles chronology
"Give Us a Goal" (1978)	"Rock 'n' Roll Bolero" (1978)	"Ginny, Ginny" (1979)

"Rock 'n' Roll Bolero" is a song by English rock band Slade, released on 6 October 1978 as a non-album single. It was written by lead vocalist Noddy Holder and bassist Jim Lea, and was produced by Slade. The song failed to make an appearance in the UK Singles Chart.

== Background ==
"Rock 'n' Roll Bolero" featured the return of Jim Lea's electric violin; the first time on a Slade single since "Coz I Luv You" in 1971. "Rock 'n' Roll Bolero" was originally recorded on 28 and 29 June 1978 under the working title "I've Been Rejected". The band then re-recorded the song under its final title at Portland Studios in London on 3, 4 and 5 July 1978. It was the first single the band had produced themselves, instead of by their manager and producer of nine years, Chas Chandler.

In a radio interview conducted backstage at the Watford nightclub Baileys in September 1978, Noddy Holder spoke of the song and the band's decision to produce the song themselves,

"It's the first single we produced ourselves. We felt we were [in] a bit of a stalemate and we had a chat with Chas [Chandler] who has produced our records for the last nine years. We talked it over and Chas said to us, 'It's about time you started producing yourselves [and] get into the production side of it.' What we wanted to do was to make a record, the next single, [which would] give people a shock and I think that's what we've achieved with 'Rock 'n' Roll Bolero'. I think people are going to say 'that don't sound like Slade', but it's a commercial sound and it's very different for us. We've used a lot of violin on it and things like that, and it's just not us."

In a 1979 fan club interview, Lea spoke of the song's reception, "The comment on 'Rock 'n' Roll Bolero' is that it was different for Slade, but it was ordinary compared to everything else that was going around at the time. But I really dig the record myself! You see, when we walk on stage we can rip the arse off straight rock, but we can't do the same with 'Rock 'n' Roll Bolero'. It's great on record, but it's us thinking, it's not us being ourselves."

== Release ==
"Rock 'n' Roll Bolero" was released at a time when Slade, having returned to the UK from the United States in 1976, found themselves out of favour in the UK music scene, particularly with the explosion of punk rock. The single was another commercial disappointment and was Slade's fourth since 1976 not to enter the UK Singles Chart. It was released to coincide with the band's October–November UK tour.

== Critical reception ==
Upon its release, Steve Gett of Record Mirror commented, "A more mellow Slade here: gone are the raucous Noddy Holder vocals and the crashing guitars. The fact remains that they're in dire need of a hit and this could be the one." John Pidgeon of Melody Maker remarked, "Same as ever, apart from the Syn-drum, sole concession to modernity. How can a group who strung so many hits together a few years back fade so completely? It wasn't them who changed, so it must be us." Tony Parsons of NME noted that Slade "these days occupy the sad netherworld of pop's wasteland" and continued, "Slade seem subdued, Noddy himself is so mellowed that I look forward to the band covering 'Happy Xmas (War Is Over)', and any song that rips off Ravel for their hookline-punch has just got to be a load of cobblers." Mike Pryce of the Worcester Evening News wrote, "Groping in the dark for another hit. Slade have come up with this totally forgettable song that they'll probably want to forget." Geoff Ginsberg of AllMusic, in a retrospective review of the bootleg album Gospel According to Noddy!, praised the B-side, "It's Alright Buy Me", as "unbelievably catchy and just cooks".

== Formats ==
7-inch single (UK, Germany and Belgium)

1. "Rock 'n' Roll Bolero" – 4:04
2. "It's Alright Buy Me" – 3:20

7-inch single (France)

1. "It's Alright Buy Me" – 3:20
2. "Rock 'n' Roll Bolero" – 4:04

== Personnel ==
Slade

- Noddy Holder – lead vocals, rhythm guitar
- Dave Hill – lead guitar, backing vocals
- Jim Lea – electric violin, bass, backing vocals
- Don Powell – drums

Production

- Slade – production ("Rock 'n' Roll Bolero")
- Chas Chandler – production ("It's Alright Buy Me")
