= Gypsy Roadhog =

- UK/European cover of "Gypsy Roadhog".

Single by Slade

from the album Whatever Happened to Slade
- B-side: "Forest Full of Needles"
- Released: 21 January 1977
- Genre: Glam rock, hard rock
- Length: 3:20
- Label: Barn
- Songwriter(s): Noddy Holder, Jim Lea
- Producer(s): Chas Chandler

Slade singles chronology
"Nobody's Fool" (1976)	"Gypsy Roadhog" (1977)	"Burning in the Heat of Love" (1977)

Audio sample
- file; help

Alternative Cover
- Belgian cover of "Gypsy Roadhog".

"Gypsy Roadhog" is a song by the British rock band Slade, released on 21 January 1977 as the only single from the band's seventh studio album, Whatever Happened to Slade. It was written by lead vocalist Noddy Holder and bassist Jim Lea, and produced by Chas Chandler. It reached No. 48 in the UK.

== Background ==
Having returned from the US in late 1976, Slade found the UK music business much changed from when they had left in 1975 to try and crack the American market. Punk rock had exploded to become the dominant influence on youth culture and the music press. Upon their return, the band began recording their new album Whatever Happened to Slade, and in January 1977, "Gypsy Roadhog" was released as the lead single. After performing the song on the children's television show Blue Peter, complaints about the song's lyrics saw the song largely removed from the Radio 1 playlist. As a result, the single stalled at No. 48, and remained in the charts for only two weeks. Whatever Happened to Slade was released in March but failed to chart.

The song's lyrics depicted the tale of a cocaine dealer in America. In a 1989 interview on Sky by Day, Holder recalled the song and its banning: "The song was all about a cocaine dealer in America, but it was actually an anti-drug song. The next day in all the newspapers, Keith Richards had just been arrested for cocaine and there's all things in the paper about using silver spoons and everything. Blue Peter went berserk when they found out the song was about cocaine, 'cause it had already gone out then. Radio One banned the record and it sank without a trace."

== Release ==
"Gypsy Roadhog" was released on 7" vinyl by Barn Records in the UK, Ireland, Belgium and Germany. It was the first Slade single to be released on Barn Records, which was owned by the band's manager Chas Chandler, with distribution and marketing by Polydor Records. The B-side, "Forest Full of Needles", was exclusive to the single and would later appear on the band's 2007 compilation B-Sides.

== Promotion ==
The band performed the song on Top of the Pops, Supersonic and also Blue Peter. In a 1986 fan club interview, Lea recalled that the BBC demanded Slade alter the words for the performance of the song on the show. Despite the change of lyrics, complaints were still received and the single received little play on Radio 1. The band's performance on Top of the Pops would not surface again until January 2012 when it was fully played on BBC4.

== Critical reception ==
Upon its release, Anna Knop of the Dalkeith Advertiser commented that Slade had returned "in fine storming style" with the single, which "seems to mix the best of the old Slade with the best of the new". Barbara Carthorse of Record Mirror awarded "Gypsy Roadhog" a three out of five rating and wrote, "Slade return to the fold and just as if there had been no musical progression in the last two years. They could be in the same league as Quo if they tidied up their sound." Caroline Coon of Melody Maker believed that the band would reach the "top 30, if they're lucky" and added how the song was reminiscent of the band's past work, noting, "I do seem to recall having heard this song, or something awfully similar, once before at least".

Steve Clarke of the NME called it a "nondescript rocker, replete with lavish rhythm chording that completely lacks any finesse". He added, "Slade won't haul themselves back with stuff like this. Next." Brian Kelly of the Skelmersdale Reporter gave the song a rating of 3 out of 10 and was negative in his review, remarking that the "belted-out piece of horrible noise sounds like it took about as long to record as it probably did to write – about five minutes". He continued, "All I can wonder is how on earth they have the nerve to come back to the [UK] with such unadulterated dross! If they want to take up where they left off music wise, they'll have to do better than this."

== Track listing ==
7" Single

1. "Gypsy Roadhog" - 3:20
2. "Forest Full of Needles" - 3:30

== Chart performance ==
Chart (1977)	Peak position
UK Singles Chart	48

== Personnel ==
Slade

- Noddy Holder - lead vocals, rhythm guitar
- Dave Hill - lead guitar, backing vocals
- Jim Lea - bass, backing vocals
- Don Powell - drums

Additional personnel

- Chas Chandler - producer
