= The Greatest Hits of Eric Burdon and The Animals =

Greatest hits album by Eric Burdon and the Animals
- Released: March 1969
- Recorded: 1967–68
- Genre: Rock, psychedelic rock, hard rock
- Length: 47:17
- Label: MGM SE-4602

The Animals US chronology
Love Is (1968)	The Greatest Hits of Eric Burdon and The Animals (1969)	Before We Were So Rudely Interrupted (1977)

The Greatest Hits of Eric Burdon and The Animals was the group's compilation representing the Animals' last three lineups, and showcased their venture into psychedelic rock. It was released in March 1969 in the US but never put out in the United Kingdom; it was the last album MGM Records would release in (more or less) the group's lifetime. Despite containing three tracks that had been US Top 15 singles, the collection was not commercially successful, placing only at number 153 on the Billboard 200.

The 1979 Rolling Stone Record Guide said that while the album's songs "are, in a way, great fun as memorabilia, they are surely no more than that." Allmusic considers it "An okay compilation of its kind", but supplanted by later compilations issued after the group had broken up.

Professional ratings
Review scores
Source	Rating
Allmusic	link
Rolling Stone Record Guide	(1979)

== Track listing ==
=== Side 1 ===
1. "River Deep, Mountain High" (Phil Spector, Jeff Barry, Ellie Greenwich) – 7:20 (from Love Is)
2. "San Franciscan Nights" (Eric Burdon, Vic Briggs, John Weider, Barry Jenkins, Danny McCulloch) – 3:24 (from Winds of Change)
3. "Year of the Guru" (Burdon) – 5:25 (from Every One of Us)
4. "Anything" (Burdon, Briggs, Weider, Jenkins, McCulloch) – 3:20 (from Winds of Change)
5. "Monterey" (Burdon, Briggs, Weider, Jenkins, McCulloch) – 4:18 (from The Twain Shall Meet)

=== Side 2 ===
1. "White Houses" (Burdon) – 4:43 (from Every One of Us)
2. "Winds of Change" (Burdon, Briggs, Weider, Jenkins, McCulloch) – 4:00 (from Winds of Change)
3. "To Love Somebody" (Barry Gibb, Robin Gibb) – 7:20 (from Love Is)
4. "Sky Pilot" (Burdon, Briggs, Weider, Jenkins, McCulloch) – 7:27 (from The Twain Shall Meet)

== Personnel ==
- Eric Burdon - vocals
- Vic Briggs - guitar except as indicated below
- John Weider - guitar, violin
- Danny McCulloch - bass except as indicated below
- Barry Jenkins - drums
- Zoot Money - keyboards on "White Houses" and "Year Of The Guru", keyboards and bass on "River Deep, Mountain High" and "To Love Somebody"
- Andy Summers - guitar on "River Deep, Mountain High" and "To Love Somebody"

== Charts ==
Chart (1969)	Peak position
US Billboard Top LPs	153
