= Burning in the Heat of Love =

1977 single by Slade

Single by Slade
- B-side: "Ready Steady Kids"
- Released: 7 April 1977
- Genre: Hard rock
- Length: 3:50
- Label: Barn
- Songwriters: Noddy Holder; Jim Lea
- Producer: Chas Chandler

Slade singles chronology
"Gypsy Roadhog" (1977)	"Burning in the Heat of Love" (1977)	"My Baby Left Me but That's Alright Mama" (1977)

"Burning in the Heat of Love" is a song by English rock band Slade, released in 1977 as a non-album single. It was written by lead vocalist Noddy Holder and bassist Jim Lea, and was produced by Chas Chandler. The song failed to make an appearance in the UK Singles Chart.

== Background ==
"Burning in the Heat of Love" was released at a time when Slade, having returned to the UK from the United States in 1976, found themselves out of favour in the UK music scene, particularly with the explosion of punk rock. Both the single "Gypsy Roadhog" and its parent album, Whatever Happened to Slade, were commercial disappointments when released in early 1977. As the band and their manager/producer Chas Chandler agreed that were no other obvious potential hit singles from the album, "Burning in the Heat of Love" was written and recorded within a week in March 1977 to be the band's next single release. Lead vocalist Noddy Holder told the Sunday Sun in 1977, "[The song is] similar in style to the album but more commercial. We like to feel we appeal to both the rock and pop markets."

"Burning in the Heat of Love" was recorded on 17 March 1977 and was mixed the following day. The B-side, "Ready Steady Kids", was recorded and mixed at Advision Studios in London on 26 and 27 January 1977. The single was a commercial disappointment and was Slade's second since 1976 not to enter the top 50 of the UK Singles Chart.

== Critical reception ==
Upon its release, Barry Cain of Record Mirror wrote, "Slade are okay. But they're gone. [Three stars] for the 'You Really Got Me' guitar riff." Chas de Whalley of Sounds remarked, "The dirtiest ballsiest single of the lot. Slightly old fashioned, but disease ridden all the same. I like it." The Coventry Evening Telegraph stated, "Slade are back in business with a vengeance. This single marks a slight change in direction for Noddy's boys. It's powerful rock and generates bags of atmosphere. A hit!"

== Formats ==
7-inch single (UK, France, Germany, Belgium and Italy)

1. "Burning in the Heat of Love" – 3:50
2. "Ready Steady Kids" – 3:57

== Personnel ==
Slade

- Noddy Holder – lead vocals, guitar
- Dave Hill – lead guitar, backing vocals
- Jim Lea – bass, backing vocals
- Don Powell – drums

Production

- Chas Chandler – production

== Girlschool version ==
"Burning in the Heat"

Single by Girlschool

from the album Play Dirty
- B-side: "Surrender"
- Released: 30 January 1984
- Length: 3:00
- Label: Bronze
- Songwriters: Jim Lea; Noddy Holder
- Producers: Jim Lea; Noddy Holder

Girlschool singles chronology
"20th Century Boy" (1983)	"Burning in the Heat" (1984)	"I'm the Leader of the Gang (I Am)" (1986)

In 1983, British rock band Girlschool recorded the song as "Burning in the Heat" for their fourth studio album, Play Dirty, which was produced by Lea and Holder. It was released as the album's second and final single on 30 January 1984.

=== Critical reception ===
Upon its release as a single, Tommy Vance, reviewing for Kerrang!, called it "the most commercial record they've ever made" and "very cleverly done" with a "great production". He added, "The beginning is rather like Bach but it quickly switches into a guitar riff similar to 'You Really Got Me' from the Kinks. The vocals aren't especially great, but then that's never been a strong point with Girlschool." Julie Birchill of NME stated, "Girlschool sound as though they are having a good time but unfortunately they make it sound like a closed shop. They should go to America and wipe the floor with Pat Benatar. They could have been born for heavy rotation on MTV." Tony Jasper of Music Week felt the song was "nothing special", but noted the "hard rasping moments on guitar and vocals". Limahl, as guest reviewer for Smash Hits, commented that "this little ditty seems terribly American" and continued, "I'm sorry, I don't like this at all. I've heard this sort of thing a million times before. In fact, I'm sure I've heard the melody somewhere before too."

=== Formats ===
7-inch single (UK and Australia) and 12-inch single (UK)

1. "Burning in the Heat" – 3:00
2. "Surrender" – 3:26

=== Personnel ===
Girlschool

- Kelly Johnson – lead vocals ("Burning in the Heat"), lead guitar, backing vocals
- Kim McAuliffe – rhythm guitar, lead vocals ("Surrender"), backing vocals
- Gil Weston – bass, backing vocals
- Denise Dufort – drums

Production

- Jim Lea – production, mixing
- Noddy Holder – production

Other

- Nexus – photography
- Polly – design

=== Charts ===
Chart (1984)	Peak position
UK Heavy Metal Singles (MRIB)	10

== Other cover versions ==
- In circa 1980, Lea recorded a version of "Burning in the Heat of Love" as part of his side project, The Dummies, with his brother Frank. It first surfaced on the 1985 various artists compilation Metal Killers Kollection, released in the UK and Germany by Castle Communications, where it was credited to Jim Lea rather than the Dummies. It was later included on the Dummies' album A Day in the Life of the Dummies (1992).
