= Mayflower Theatre =

Theatre in Southampton, England

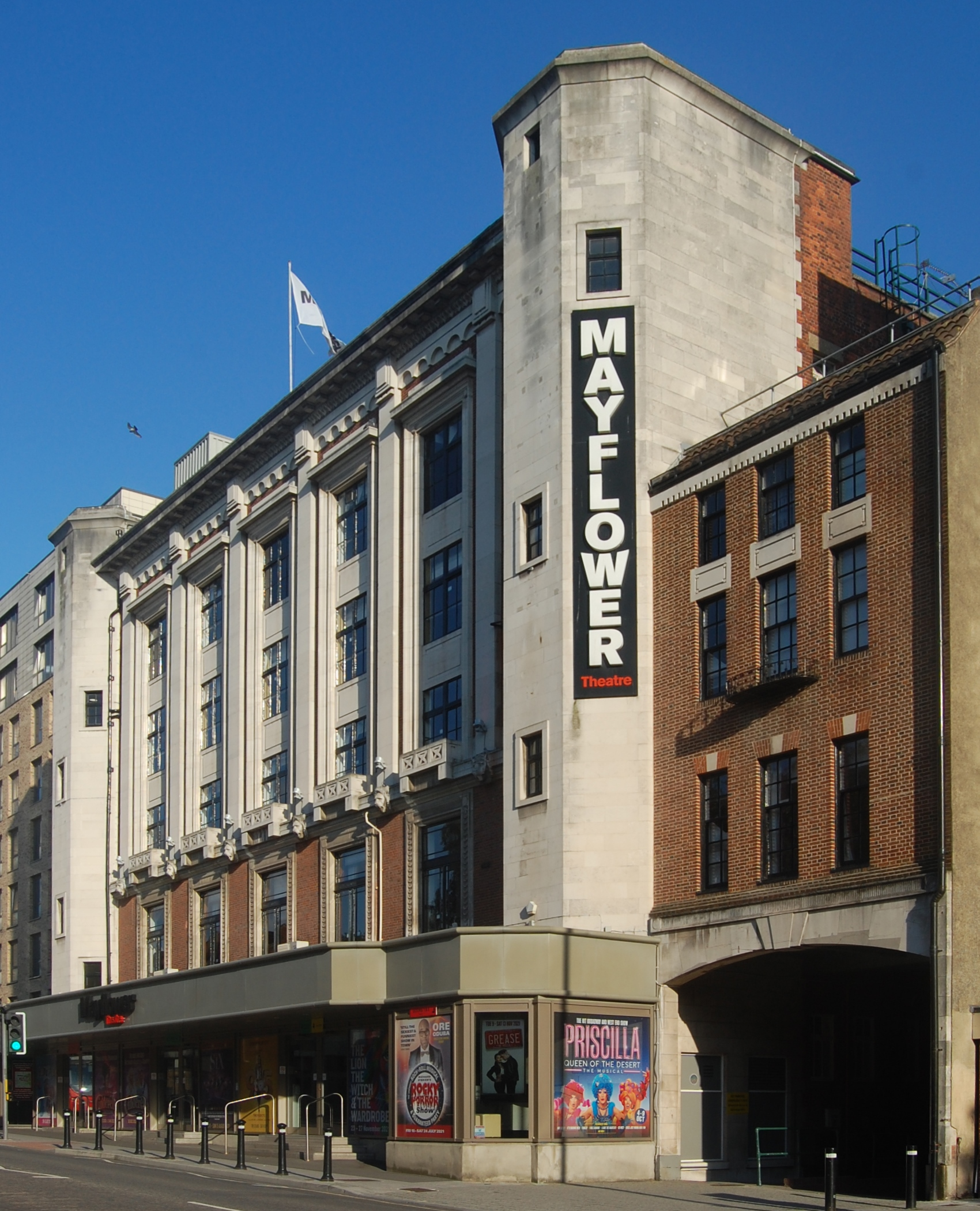
- The Mayflower Theatre in 2021

- Shown within Southampton
- Former names: Empire Theatre (1928–50); Gaumont Theatre (1950–86)
- Address: Commercial Road; Southampton; United Kingdom
- Coordinates: 50°54′31″N 1°24′37″W
- Owner: Mayflower Theatre Trust Ltd
- Capacity: 2,300
- Designation: Grade II
- Current use: Live performance venue

Construction
- Opened: December 1928
- Architects: William and T. R. Milburn

Website
- www.mayflower.org.uk

Mayflower Theatre (formerly the Gaumont Theatre and originally the Empire Theatre) is a Grade II listed theatre in the city centre of Southampton, England. With a capacity of 2,300, it features West End theatre shows when they tour the United Kingdom. In addition to this, one-off comedy shows and music events often take place at the theatre too.

It is the largest theatre in South England outside of London, being more than twice as large as Brighton's Theatre Royal and four times as large as Bristol's Old Vic.

== History ==
=== The Empire Theatre (1928–1950) ===
The theatre opened on 22 December 1928 as The Empire Theatre, part of the Moss Empire theatre group. It was part of the company's expansion of the late 1920s which also saw theatres constructed in Edinburgh, Glasgow, Liverpool, Oxford and The Dominion, in London.

At the time of construction, it was the largest theatre in the south of England, a title it still holds.The theatre's proximity to Southampton Central railway station made its location ideal, but meant that many shows were not as spectacular as their London counterparts. The theatre suffered in early days, due to the arrival of cinema, with sound or 'talkies'. This led to the 1933 installation of a projection box in the balcony and a screen, which could be raised and lowered at the front of the stage. By 1942, the theatre was mainly used as a cinema and was taken over by The Gaumont-British Picture Corporation.

=== Gaumont Theatre (1950–1986) ===
As part of the Rank Organisation, the theatre has hosted concerts by many famous artists, including Bill Haley & His Comets in 1957, the Beatles in 1963, the Rolling Stones supported by Ike & Tina Turner and The Yardbirds in 1966, Jimi Hendrix and Cat Stevens 1967, Led Zeppelin in 1973, Queen in 1974, 1975 and 1977, The Police in 1979 and 1982, Rush in February 1978, Iron Maiden in 1980, 1981, and 1983, Status Quo, Kate Bush in 1979, AC/DC's last concert with Bon Scott in January 1980, and Ozzy Osbourne in October 1980. On the afternoon of their 1981 concert there, Slade filmed a music video for their single "Wheels Ain't Coming Down" at the theatre.

The building was still, however, mainly used as a cinema, which was in decline, due to the rise of television. This led to Rank investigating a change of use to, either dance hall or ten-pin bowling alley. This did not happen and many other acts appeared, until the end of the 1980s, when acts preferred larger concert halls and arenas.

The theatre was threatened, with a change of use, again, in 1970, when an application was made to convert it into a bingo hall. This also did not happen, but the owners were still not making money. In 1982, the Rank, again, applied to Southampton City Council, for a change of licence, to turn the building into a bingo hall. This was refused in 1983, the year the building also achieved grade II listed status. The council instead offered to buy the building, for £650,000 and a refurbishment of £3 million. This led to the 1989 setting up of a charitable trust, with the lease for a peppercorn rent, to stop the theatre from becoming a political tool.

=== Name change to the Mayflower Theatre (1987) ===
The theatre closed for major redevelopment in January 1986, with the entire stage area being improved and additional facilities, such as computerised box office, being added. The theatre opened, as The Mayflower, on 24 February 1987, with a production of Peter Pan starring Bonnie Langford, with the official opening gala, televised in May. Initial audiences proved disappointing and there was talk of the project being a white elephant. This changed, with the introduction of major pantomimes. These attracted huge audiences, peaking with 1994's Dick Whittington, starring Lesley Joseph and John Nettles, which attracted 126,256 theatregoers.

Musicals also made up a big part of the turnaround of the theatre. 1990 brought a full-scale version of the West End's 42nd Street, followed by Evita. These proved huge successes and, along with the pantomimes, ensured the continued success of the theatre. Cats arrived in 1994, bringing an audience of 125,000. This was followed by many other shows, including The Phantom of the Opera, which achieved the record attendance of 185,000 in 2000.

=== Refurbishment (2003) ===
In 2003, the theatre closed, again, for refurbishment. The main aspect, being the change of stage from a raked stage to a flat stage. Improvement for disabled access were also made, including the construction of a new lift. The theatre reopened, with the large scale production of Miss Saigon, which would not have previously been possible. The run of major musicals has continued with a five-week run of Starlight Express, in 2005 and shows, such as Saturday Night Fever, Miss Saigon, The Rocky Horror Show and Disney's Beauty and the Beast, in 2006. The tour of Chitty Chitty Bang Bang visited the Mayflower, for almost 3 months, in 2007. The 2007 Christmas show was Michael Rose and Chris Moreno's production of The Wizard of Oz, starring Russ Abbot, Gregor Fisher, Gary Wilmot and Matthew Kelly, as The Wicked Witch of the West. The 2008 season included Andrew Lloyd Webber's Aspects of Love and Cats and the new productions of Zorro and The Wedding Singer. In 2009, the traditional Christmas show was Cinderella, starring Christopher Biggins, Matthew Kelly, Craig McLachlan and Stefanie Powers.

Also in 2009, the Mayflower welcomed West Side Story, Calendar Girls and Evita, among other shows, before closing for three months, for massive development of the backstage areas, including a new scene dock and also refurbishment of the stalls and circle bar. The Season then continued, with LazyTown Live! The Pirate Adventure, followed by shows, including The Sound of Music and High School Musical 2. Shows in 2010 included a return of Chitty Chitty Bang Bang, the first national tour of Hairspray and the 25th anniversary tour of Les Misérables booking.

=== Foyer redevelopment (2013) ===
Around summer 2012, during an open day to celebrate twenty-five years of the Mayflower, an appeal was launched for plans of changing the main foyer, which no longer met the modern needs of the theatre. The key benefits were as follows:

- More space
- Bigger box office area
- Street-level wheelchair access
- Covered access to the Ovation restaurant
- Modernisation
- In keeping with Grade II status

After the last performance of the musical Strictly Confidential finished, work began on extending the foyer for over a couple of months. Along with the new branding and a new logo, the extended foyer of the theatre was opened on 30 August 2013, in time with the first performance of the Mayflower Theatre's Summer Youth Project performance of Bugsy Malone. In 2014, the UK tours of the West End musicals The Lion King and Wicked visited the theatre. In 2015, the UK tour of Shrek The Musical visited the theatre, and in 2016, the UK tour of Mary Poppins the Musical visited the theatre.

=== Refurbishment (Summer 2018) ===
In the summer of 2018, the theatre closed for three months for refurbishment after a 4-week run of War Horse. The main focus of the works was within the auditorium. All of the seats in the stalls and circle were replaced completely, with the seats in the balcony being re-upholstered to match the new seats. The auditorium was also completely redecorated, a departure from the green colour scheme for which the theatre was well known, bringing a new royal red and gold colour scheme. In addition to this, many of the front of house areas were re-decorated to match the new auditorium look.

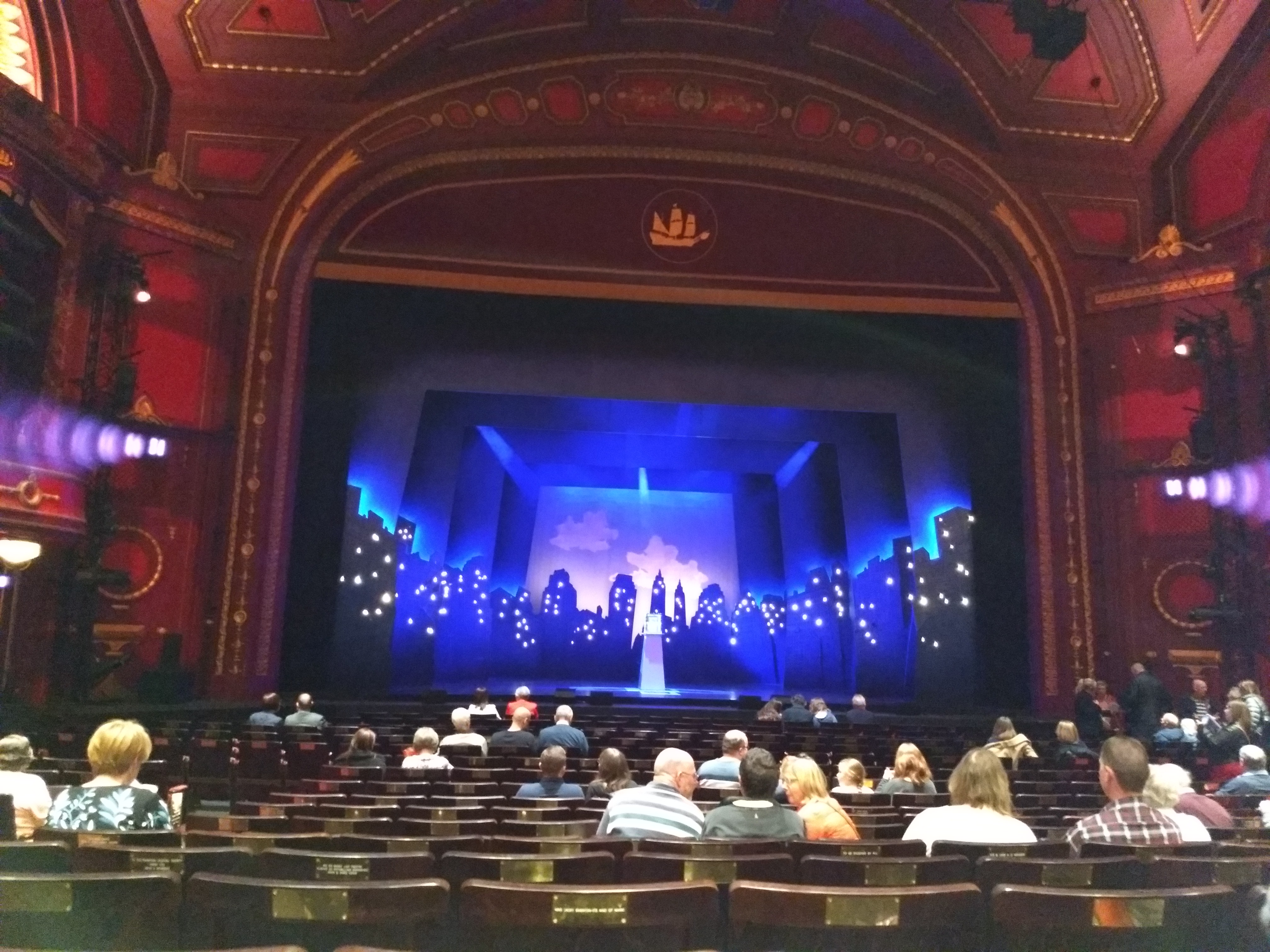
New colour scheme at the Mayflower Theatre, from September 2018

The main works completed during the closure were as follows:

- Repainting the entire auditorium, with a brand-new red and gold colour scheme
- Removing all of the seats in the stalls and circle and replacing with 1,659 brand-new (and wider) seats
- Re-upholstering all seats in the balcony
- Installing new environmentally-friendly LED lighting
- Increasing accessibility, with better facilities for people with disabilities
- Moving the orchestra pit to be partially under the stage and installing a lift so it can be collapsed
- Renovating the plasterwork
- Redecorating the restaurant, bars and function rooms

The Mayflower Theatre reopened in September 2018 with a gala evening on 26 September, attended by the theatre's staff, executive members, contractors who had worked on the project and other invited guests.

=== New rehearsal studio ===
In June 2025, the Mayflower announced the construction of a new expansion on the back of the theatre's site. Works began in June 2025 while the theatre remained open and receiving productions, with construction expected to finish by the late summer of 2026. The main theatre will close and pause programming from May to August 2026 to facilitate the construction, with the annual youth production instead performing in Studio 1 at Mayflower Studios.

The expansion includes:

- A double-height rehearsal studio (for use by visiting companies and youth productions)
- Two fully accessible dressing rooms
- A new combined stage door & reception
- New stage-level access for disabled performers
