= Six of the Best (EP) =

EP by Slade
- Released: 16 June 1980
- Recorded: 1979–80
- Genre: Rock
- Label: Super
- Producer: Slade

Slade chronology
Okey Cokey (1979)	Six of the Best (1980)	Alive at Reading (1980)

Six of the Best is an extended play (EP) by the British rock band Slade, released on 16 June 1980. Six of the Best includes six tracks; three new tracks and three taken from the band's 1979 studio album Return to Base. All songs were written by lead vocalist Noddy Holder and bassist Jim Lea, except "I'm a Rocker" which was written by Chuck Berry. The EP was produced by Slade and failed to enter the UK charts.

== Background ==
Having returned to the UK from the United States in August 1976, Slade found themselves out of favour at the time of the UK's Punk rock explosion. The band's 1977 album Whatever Happened to Slade proved a commercial failure while their tour that spring had shown that they could no longer fill large venues. Slade's waning success soon led to the band playing small gigs after that, including universities and clubs. Despite being successful at filling small venues for their live performances, the band's new records were barely selling. After the commercial failure of the band's 1979 album Return to Base, the band's next release would be Six of the Best in June 1980. Alongside the EP, a promotional-only single, "Night Starvation", was released to try and gain radio airplay.

Despite having the low selling price of £1.49, the EP failed to chart, with "Night Starvation" failing to generate sufficient airplay. In Belgium, the EP reached No. 3 on the Telemoustique Chart; a weekly rock chart compiled by public votes. The lack of success in the UK continued the band's struggles. In June, the band embarked on a UK tour to promote the EP, but by July were on the verge of disbanding. The band's fortunes changed after they were offered a headlining slot at the Reading festival in August 1980, following a late cancellation by Ozzy Osbourne. The band's performance in front of the 65,000-strong crowd saw Slade back in the public eye. The music press began to take an interest in the band again, while heavy metal followers also began deeming the band 'cool'.

Six of the Best was released on 12" vinyl in the UK only on manager Chas Chandler's label Six Of The Best Records. The A-Side was named the "Rock Side", while the B-Side was named the "Back Side". The EP featured three new songs; "Night Starvation", "When I'm Dancin' I Ain't Fightin'" and "9 to 5". The other three tracks, "I'm A Rocka", "Don't Waste Your Time" and "The Wheels Ain't Coming Down", were taken from Return to Base and were remixed for inclusion on the EP. Lea designed the EP's sleeve.

In a 1980 fan club interview, Holder spoke of the EP and the band's struggles at that time:

"After Return to Base, there was a period of us writing songs and seeing how they turned out. Like "When I'm Dancin' I Ain't Fightin'" and "9 to 5" - to us they were all good songs - but they didn't sell huge quantities of records. Therefore, we got to a point where we thought that we'd cool it for a little while and not go in the studio. Jim was working on his band The Dummies - so me and Jim decided to write a song specifically for them. The final record got lots of radio play. So we knew that we could still write songs that would get played on the radio. Then it was a case of thinking "where do Slade go from here?" We now knew that our songs were strong. Then the Reading Festival came along. You've seen the reaction on "When I'm Dancin' I Ain't Fightin'" now - when we first brought the track out on the Six of the Best EP, it didn't see the light of day as far as charts were concerned - but now it's on the Reading EP and all the crowds are singing it!"

== Track listing ==
1. "Night Starvation" - 3:08
2. "When I'm Dancin' I Ain't Fightin'" - 3:12
3. "I'm a Rocker" - 2:47
4. "Don't Waste Your Time" - 3:29
5. "Wheels Ain't Coming Down" - 3:39
6. "Nine to Five" - 2:53

== Critical reception ==
Upon release, Charlie Gillett of Music Week said: "Rasping guitar, spot-on Holder vocals, earthy and commercial, catchy riff. Six cuts, no duffs. Slade are no has-beens."

John Ogden of Wolverhampton Express and Star said:

"A confident-sounding Slade are all set for a big attempt to get back into the charts. "Night Starvation" deals fairly graphically with one of the lead vocalist Noddy Holder's pre-occupations - sex. It fairly stomps along, but I'm afraid that the too-basic lyrics count against it. There are no rude words, it's just a bit too unsubtle in this day and age. However, it is the sort of song which has made Slade so popular in the past, and it carries on Nod's lascivious but humourous [sic] image well enough. I'd have preferred to see "9 to 5" getting the plays. This is a song which chugs along nicely in an almost rockabilly rhythm, and is sung in a light-hearted manner which comes off well. Nowhere near as frantic as "Night Starvation", it exudes a far better spirit. "When I'm Dancin' I Ain't Fightin'" also makes a good listen. It's got a rowdy background of cheering to it, and thumps along in style. The excellent "Don't Waste Your Time", with its Garth Hudson-type organ sound; the out-and-out rock and roll sound of an old Chuck Berry number "I'm a Rocker", and the equally fine "Wheels Ain't Coming Down", which proves such a show-stopper on live gigs, all demonstrate Slade at their best - entertaining, amusing, and full of energy."

== Chart performance ==
Chart (1980)	Peak position
Belgian Telemoustique Singles Chart	3

== Personnel ==
Slade

- Noddy Holder - lead vocals, guitar, producer
- Dave Hill - lead guitar, backing vocals, producer
- Jim Lea - bass, backing vocals, producer
- Don Powell - drums, producer

Additional personnel

- Dave Garland - engineer
- Paul Plant - engineer
