= Lise Lyng Falkenberg =

Danish writer

Lise Lyng Falkenberg (born 17 May 1962) is a Danish writer of mostly fiction, biographies and works of literary studies.

Falkenberg was born in Odense, Denmark. Since her first in 1983, a dozen of her books have been published as well as hundreds of articles, essays and reviews on movies, plays, literature, art and music. She has a PhD in literature and cultural studies and is currently living in the city of Odense, Denmark, where she works both as a writer and as an international freelance journalist.

Since 2001 Falkenberg has written directly for the English-language market and since 2012 her books have been available as ebooks. Her English titles so far:

- The Monkees - caught in a false image, ISBN 87-90767-31-4, 2001, on the American TV-series/pop band The Monkees
- Twisted Tales of Thanatos, ISBN 87-90767-72-1, 2003, a collection of short stories written in the magic realistic genre.
- Greatest Hits 1996-2011, ISBN 978-1-4660-0813-7, 2012, a collection of Falkenberg's best-selling short stories.
- Souls Astray, ISBN 978-1-4764-1623-6, 2012, a ghost story about a fairy tale romance that turns into a nightmare.
- The Monkees - caught in a false image 2nd edition, ISBN 978-1-4764-2233-6, 2012, an updated ebook edition of Falkenberg's 2001 Monkees biography.
- Build Me a Bridge, ISBN 978-1-3016-3951-9, 2012, a murder mystery about mutual dependent twins.
- The Boy Who Wouldn't Grow Up - But Did, ISBN 978-1-3018-6731-8, 2013, the English version of Falkenberg's 1999 study of Peter Pan.
- Never Mind It, ISBN 978-1-3018-0698-0, 2013, a hilarious postmodern metatext about writing and relationships.
- Look Wot I Dun, ISBN 978-1-78305-040-6, 2013, the official biography of the British Slade-drummer Don Powell.
- Metanoia, ISBN 978-1-3117-0335-4, 2014, ten short stories about myths, death, love, regret and betrayal.
- Idyll, ISBN 978-0-4631-1990-7, 2019, this magic realism novel is a social commentary/fairy tale for grown ups. Illustrated by the author.

Since 2005, Falkenberg has worked with British rock band Slade, especially their drummer Don Powell and this has led to a string of Slade-related blogs on the internet as well as many articles and interviews in magazines and papers. In 2006 Don Powell asked Falkenberg to write his biography and the book was released in late 2013.
