= Barn Records =

British record label

- Founded: 1976; 50 years ago
- Status: Defunct
- Distributors: Phonogram (1976-78); Pinnacle (1979-80)
- Country of origin: UK

Barn Records was a record label established by the English musician, record producer and manager Chas Chandler. It was active from 1976 to 1980, and included the production company Barn Productions and publishing company Barn Publishing Ltd. The label was based at Portland Studios in London, which was formerly known as IBC Studios until Chandler purchased them in 1978.

The label's most notable artist was Slade, while others included The Animals, Medicine Head, The Depressions, Stavely Makepeace, Nick Van Eede and Splinter.

== History ==
Chandler formed Barn in early 1976. At the time, he had been the manager of the successful British rock band Slade since 1969 and convinced them to sign with his new label. Chandler originally negotiated a licensing deal with Polydor, who agreed to finance the label based on the strength of the Slade name. The label's debut single release was "Love on My Mind" by Brian Parrish, released in July 1976.

Barn released only two singles which made an entry into the UK charts. The first was Slade's "Gypsy Roadhog", which reached No. 48 in the UK. The second was Slade's "My Baby Left Me", released later in 1977, which gave Barn its highest charting single at No. 32. Despite this, the band's other Barn releases into 1979 failed to chart. Singles such as "Burning in the Heat of Love", "Rock 'n' Roll Bolero", "Ginny, Ginny" and "Sign of the Times" all failed to sell and most copies were melted down.

In 1976, The Animals reunited and recorded a new album, which was released the following year on Barn as Before We Were So Rudely Interrupted. The band were billed as "The Original Animals". Other album releases on Barn included Brian Parrish's Love on My Mind (1976), Medicine Head's Two Man Band (1976) and Slade's Whatever Happened to Slade (1977) and Return to Base (1979). Barn's final release was the Ada Wilson single "In the Quiet of My Room", released in January 1980. Following this, Chandler established the short-lived Six of the Best label, and was also involved in the independent Cheapskate Records during 1980-82.

== See also ==
- List of record labels
