= Worcester News =

UK newspaper

- Worcester News heading
- Type: Daily Local Newspaper (Monday–Saturday)
- Format: Tabloid
- Owner: USA Today Co.
- Publisher: Newsquest
- Editor: Stephanie Preece
- Launched: 29 January 1935; 90 years ago
- Headquarters: Redhill House; 227 London Road; Worcester; WR5 2JG.
- City: Worcester
- Country: England, UK
- Circulation: 2,687 (as of 2024)
- Sister newspapers: Berrow's Worcester Journal
- ISSN: 1747-9150
- OCLC number: 456271916
- Website: worcesternews.co.uk

The Worcester News is a local newspaper, and the only daily newspaper in Worcester (UK), reporting on breaking news and local matters covering the City of Worcester and surrounding areas within the county. It was previously named Worcester Evening News until it was rebranded in July 2005.

The newspaper is published Monday to Saturday at its offices in Redhill House, Worcester.

The newspaper is owned by Newsquest Media Group, which was acquired by US-based Gannett in 1999.

The Worcester News was named Midlands Best Local Newspaper of the Year in 2010.

== Sections ==
The Worcester News has dedicated sections throughout the week:

- Wednesday Edition: Jobs pages
- Thursday Edition: Property Supplement
- Friday Edition: Motoring Section
- All editions: News, events, reviews, opinions.
