= Whatever Happened to Slade =

Studio album by Slade
- Released: 21 March 1977
- Genre: Hard rock, glam rock
- Length: 40:40
- Label: Barn
- Producer: Chas Chandler

Slade chronology
Nobody's Fools (1976)	Whatever Happened to Slade (1977)	Slade Alive, Vol. 2 (1978)

Singles from Whatever Happened to Slade
- 1. "Gypsy Roadhog" Released: January 1977

Whatever Happened to Slade is the seventh studio album by the British rock group Slade. It was released on 21 March 1977 by Barn Records, but did not enter any national album chart. By the time of the album's release, Slade's popularity was waning as were their record sales, which they acknowledged in the album's title. The glam rock movement, with which Slade was associated, had died, and the careers of other glam rock artists such as Mud, Gary Glitter and Sweet had hit the buffers. In Britain, where Slade had traditionally been most popular, the fashion of the day was punk rock. With this album, Slade stood their ground as a straight-ahead rock group; gone were their "glam" statements of the early decade.

The album was met with critical praise and support from the English punk uprising. Nevertheless, the record was a commercial failure and the band's financial woes continued. For many years, the album was a much sought-after collector's item amongst fans. However, the album is available today via CD remaster from 2007 and download. In later years, the album became a popular trade amongst American musicians developing what would be known as "grunge" as both Billy Corgan (Smashing Pumpkins) and Kurt Cobain (Nirvana) cited the album as influential. The album was voted No. 1 of the top three Slade albums in the Slade Fan Club Poll of 1979.

== Background ==
By 1975, Slade felt their commercial success had peaked in Great Britain and Europe. At manager Chas Chandler's suggestion, the band agreed to move to the United States, the only major territory that the band had yet to crack. The band held out in the US for almost two years, recording the soul-influenced Nobody's Fools (1976). Although the band did not achieve significant airplay and record sales in the US, their reputation as a reliable and exciting live rock act was enhanced and the band felt rejuvenated.

Slade returned to the UK in August 1976 to face the UK music business much changed from when they had left. Punk rock had now exploded and had become the dominant influence on youth culture and the music press. Despite Slade's reputation as one of the great high energy bands of their day, in this environment Slade had become irrelevant. Regardless, Slade were determined that they were now a better live act than ever and refused to call it a day. The band began recording their seventh studio album in August. According to the Slade Fan Club, the band hoped to record a total of 16 tracks and pick the best to release on the album.

In January 1977, the band released the upcoming album's only single "Gypsy Roadhog". However, after performing the song on the children's television show Blue Peter, complaints about the song's drug references led to the BBC banning the record. As a result, the single stalled at No. 48. Whatever Happened to Slade was released in March but failed to chart.

Recalling the album in the 1984 biography Feel the Noize!, bassist Jim Lea said: "It was a heavy metal album. It was a mistake and I was against that title." Lead vocalist Noddy Holder said in his 1999 biography Who's Crazee Now?: "Whatever Happened to Slade was much rockier than Nobody's Fools. It was a return to our original sound". In a 2009 interview answering fan questions, drummer Don Powell was asked which Slade album he would recommend to a new listener as the "definitive Slade studio album". He said: "Whatever Happened to Slade because at that particular time we had nothing to lose."

During a 2017 live question and answer event with Lea at the Robin 2 club, Lea spoke of the album: "The Whatever Happened to Slade album came out of us touring in America. There were a lot of bands over there that had got this guitar identity. There was the Allman Brothers with Duane Allman, there was ZZ Top coming along, and the guitar player was a big thing. So we started coming up with Whatever Happened to Slade and I thought it was important we had the guitar breaks. I worked them out and then we went through it. Dave did all the playing on the record."

== Music ==
"Gypsy Roadhog"
Slade's first single after returning from America to the UK, where punk rock had become popular, "Gypsy Roadhog" typifies the song's "straight" rock sound and featured controversial lyrics.

After the varied sound of their previous album, Nobody's Fools (1976), which prominently featured a "Californian" sound and influences from soul music, Whatever Happened to Slade presents a "straight" rock sound, a sound which would have helped it to settle into the punk rock-focused British music industry of the time had it had more success. AllMusic also noted the album as sounding similar to early-Kiss, but noted "its still pure Slade, though". They also noted "the songs and playing [on the album] are pretty much out of sight, with monster riffs and a different production style."

The first track on the album, "Be", became popular in Slade's live sets, featuring on the band's subsequent live album Slade Alive, Vol. 2 (1978). For a fan club newsletter in 1979, bassist Jim Lea spoke of the track, saying "songs like "Be" are hardly concise, they're clever, but hardly the sing-along down at the pub type song." AllMusic described the song as being "unlike any other the band had done".

"Gypsy Roadhog", the album's single is a tale of the exploits of an American cocaine dealer. The song featured a country rock influence, taken from Slade's touring in America. "One Eyed Jacks with Moustaches" became popular in Slade's live set, featuring on the subsequent live album Slade Alive, Vol. 2 (1978). AllMusic said the song "sounds like classic Slade, but once again, radio wouldn't touch it." "Dead Men Tell No Tales" features a slower tempo and has lyrics based on the 1949 gangster film White Heat, starring James Cagney.

== Release and promotion ==
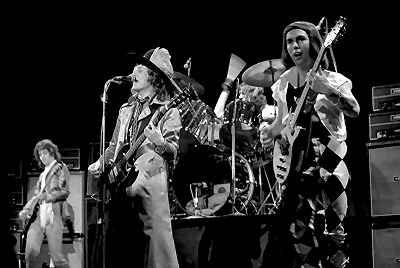
Slade performing in Sweden in April 1977, a month after the album's release

There had been no new release from Slade since the "Nobody's Fool" single had been lifted from the Nobody's Fools album in April 1976 to commercial failure. The first that was heard of Slade in 1977 was the single "Gypsy Roadhog". After the single was banned and stalled on the UK Singles Chart, the album that followed didn't have much commercial chance after that. Titled by Chandler after a piece of graffiti spotted painted on a London bridge, Whatever Happened to Slade, while intended as a defiant, ironic comment on their absence from UK shores, was more likely received as a virtual admission of how far the group's star had fallen, and few people, except perhaps a fraction of their old fan base, were in the mood to contradict them.

Whatever Happened to Slade received no airplay and very little press. It failed to chart on any national chart, including the UK Albums Chart, and became the group's lowest-selling LP to date. However, those faithful few who took the trouble were amazed by the record. Described as "the heaviest, dirtiest (in all senses), most decadent Slade music ever made", Whatever Happened to Slade was described as making "Gypsy Roadhog" sound like "The Teddy Bear's Picnic" and remains many Slade connoisseurs' favourite of all their albums. It was also influential on the grunge and alternative rock genres, with both Billy Corgan of The Smashing Pumpkins and Kurt Cobain of Nirvana citing the album as influential.

To promote the album, the band embarked on an 11-date UK concert tour, their first in two years.

The album was remastered by Tim Turan at Turan Audio for CD release in 2007 by Salvo Records, a subsidiary of Union Square Productions, as part of a series of Slade CD remasters known as the "Feel the Noize" remasters. The liner notes of the new edition describe the album as "underrated".

== Critical reception ==
Professional ratings
Review scores
Source	Rating
Sounds	4/5 stars
Record Mirror	3/5 stars

Upon its release, Pete Makowski of Sounds described Whatever Happened to Slade as "high energy on a primeval scale", with "strong tunes", "interesting" lyrics and Holder's "lethal vocals". He continued, "It's got all the ball bustin' riffs you'll find nestling comfortably alongside yer ZZ Tops and Nugents, and it's got the same suicidal pace of the Aerosmith's Rocks album." He was critical of the "slightly flat" production, which he believed "lacks the necessary sparkle" and "trebly bite that people like Jack Douglas manage to obtain", but added that Chandler still "manage[s] to capture and convey the live spirit of the band" with his "basic and effective" production. Sheila Prophet of Record Mirror felt the album was "worth giving a spin". She said that most tracks were "solid, rocking numbers", although not as "distinctive enough to make it in the same way [that] 'Cum on Feel the Noize' or 'Coz I Luv You' did". She added, "Part of the problem is that they seem to be trying too hard – laying everything on, instead of sticking with simplicity. Noddy's voice still sounds great, and Dave turns in some pretty nifty guitar, but there's just too much of everything." Peter Barnett of the East Kent Times said the album "shows the band have learned a lot from their exile and the music is much tighter, sounding more like they did before the rot set in".

Graham Smith of the Cambridge Evening News summarised, "All the raw animal power is there and the group have definitely come a long way since the days of 'Cum on Feel the Noize' and 'Mama Weer All Crazee Now'." Carol Clerk of the Acton Gazette noted that the album is "all unpretentious rock 'n' wallop", with Holder's "raucous as ever vocals", "basic, steamroller rhythms" and the "most elementary of [guitar] riffs". She concluded, "In short, it's the same old Slade with the familiar sound of yesteryear. If you liked them then, you'll like them now and you'll like this album." The Alcester Chronicle remarked that Slade are "still as brash, loud and unsubtle as before".

James Belsey of the Bristol Evening Post noted the album contained "all of Slade's aggression, but lack[s] the urgency of their earlier work". David Gritten of the Birmingham Evening Mail felt that it was an "encouraging enough album" and "far better than their last effort". He was, however, critical of the American influence on what he called a "very smooth sounding album, despite the energy of the playing and their straightforward rock and roll approach". He also believed Holder's vocals were "buried [too] far down in the production mix". Peter Trollope of the Liverpool Echo stated, "The American style of living has had its impact on their songwriting. Musically they are much the same as ever and can still belt it out with the best of them, but I'm afraid they are nowhere near par for the course on this album."

Charles Shaar Murray of the NME was not impressed with the album, calling it "loud, shrill and trebly" and remarking that it "sounds like Status Quo speeded up and stuck inside a large cardboard box". He summarised, "The songs are the standard stuff that you get from bands who've worked a lot in the States: groupie songs, on-the-road songs and cutesy-cutesy-wiv-mah-silver spoon songs, plus hopeful stabs at Colourful Americana, all tricked out with occasional Beatley side trips and garage band guitar that's almost as terrible as the guitar on the Stooges' first album but not nearly as good." Dave Murray of the Reading Evening Post stated, "Slade return with their usual hard, pulsating rock. There are a couple of reasonable tracks but most of it sounds as though Slade are stuck in their own timewarp, unable to come to terms with the latest punk rock, and at the same time unable to pull themselves free from their early riff-laden sound." A reviewer for the Wishaw Press commented that the album did not "contain enough good material to justify top priority listening", which they considered to be "just average and easily forgettable attempts at rock and roll". E. R. Bender of The Northern Echo was negative, writing, "Nothing much new in the music and very few remarkable observations on scenes that have been dealt with a hundred times over by vastly more talented and more interesting bands before them."

In the US, Tony Ciarochi of Fairbanks Daily News-Miner said the album "definitely packs punch", displaying "fairly basic rock 'n' roll" but with "British humor and sarcasm", which makes it a "refreshing change from some of the more bland sledgehammer rock grounds dominant in America."

=== Retrospective reviews ===
Professional ratings
Review scores
Source	Rating
AllMusic	3/5 stars

In a retrospective review, Geoff Ginsberg of AllMusic felt Whatever Happened to Slade had "a bit of the Hotter than Hell, early-Kiss sound", but was "still pure Slade". He described the songs as having "monster riffs and a different production style", concluding "this is a great record". Colin Harper of Record Collector felt the album "showed muscle", had US stadium boogie as a "prime influence" and featured Holder's "least charming lyrics". In 2016, Nicholas Pell of LA Weekly ranked the album at number 14 on his "20 Greatest Classic Rock Albums" list. He summarised: "This isn't just the template for grunge, it's everything good about hair metal 10 years early." He added that "Gypsy Roadhog" and "One Eyed Jacks With Moustaches" as "undeniable rock ragers", and "Dogs of Vengeance" is "what is missing from classic rock radio".

== Track listing ==
All tracks are written by Noddy Holder and Jim Lea, except "My Baby Left Me: That's Alright" by Arthur Crudup.

Side one
No.	Title	Length
1.	"Be"	3:59
2.	"Lightning Never Strikes Twice"	3:08
3.	"Gypsy Roadhog"	3:23
4.	"Dogs of Vengeance"	2:48
5.	"When Fantasy Calls"	3:23
6.	"One Eyed Jacks With Moustaches"	3:20

Side two
No.	Title	Length
7.	"Big Apple Blues"	4:38
8.	"Dead Men Tell No Tales"	3:38
9.	"She's Got the Lot"	4:34
10.	"It Ain't Love But It Ain't Bad"	3:09
11.	"The Soul, the Roll and the Motion"	4:36

2007 Salvo remaster bonus tracks
No.	Title	Length
12.	"Forest Full of Needles" (B-side of "Gypsy Roadhog")	3:30
13.	"Burning in the Heat of Love" (1977 non-album single)	3:36
14.	"Ready Steady Kids" (B-side of "Burning in the Heat of Love")	3:22
15.	"My Baby Left Me: That's Alright" (1977 non-album single)	2:24
16.	"O.H.M.S." (B-side of "My Baby Left Me")	2:41
17.	"Give Us a Goal" (1978 non-album single)	2:50
18.	"Daddio" (B-side of "Give Us a Goal")	2:34
19.	"Rock 'n' Roll Bolero" (1978 non-album single)	4:06
20.	"It's Alright Buy Me" (B-side of "Rock 'n' Roll Bolero")	3:23

== Personnel ==
Slade

- Noddy Holder – lead vocals, rhythm guitar
- Dave Hill – lead guitar, backing vocals
- Jim Lea – bass, backing vocals
- Don Powell – drums, percussion

Additional personnel

- Chas Chandler – producer
- Paul Hardiman – engineer
- Gered Mankowitz – photography
- Wade Woode Associates – artwork
- Jo Mirowski – art direction
