= Chas Chandler =

English musician (1938–1996)

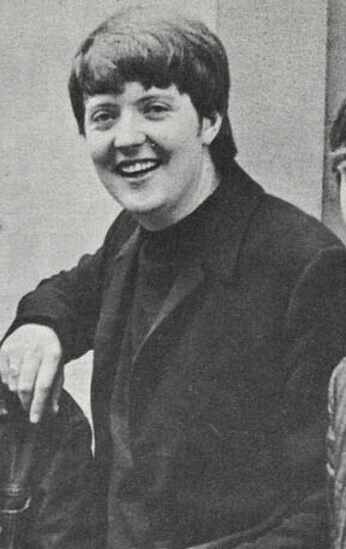
- Chandler in 1965

Background information
- Also known as: Chas Chandler
- Born: Bryan James Chandler; 18 December 1938; Heaton, Newcastle, England
- Died: 17 July 1996 (aged 57) Newcastle, England
- Genres: Rock; R&B; psychedelic rock
- Occupations: Musician; producer; A&R representative
- Instruments: Bass; vocals
- Years active: 1957–1996
- Formerly of: The Animals

Bryan James "Chas" Chandler (18 December 1938 – 17 July 1996) was an English musician, record producer, manager and the original bassist in the Animals, for which he was inducted into the Rock and Roll Hall of Fame in 1994. He also managed the Jimi Hendrix Experience and Slade.

== Early life ==
Chandler was born in Heaton, Newcastle. After leaving school, he worked as a turner in the Tyneside shipyards. He became the bass player with The Alan Price Trio in 1962.

== Career ==
=== The Animals ===
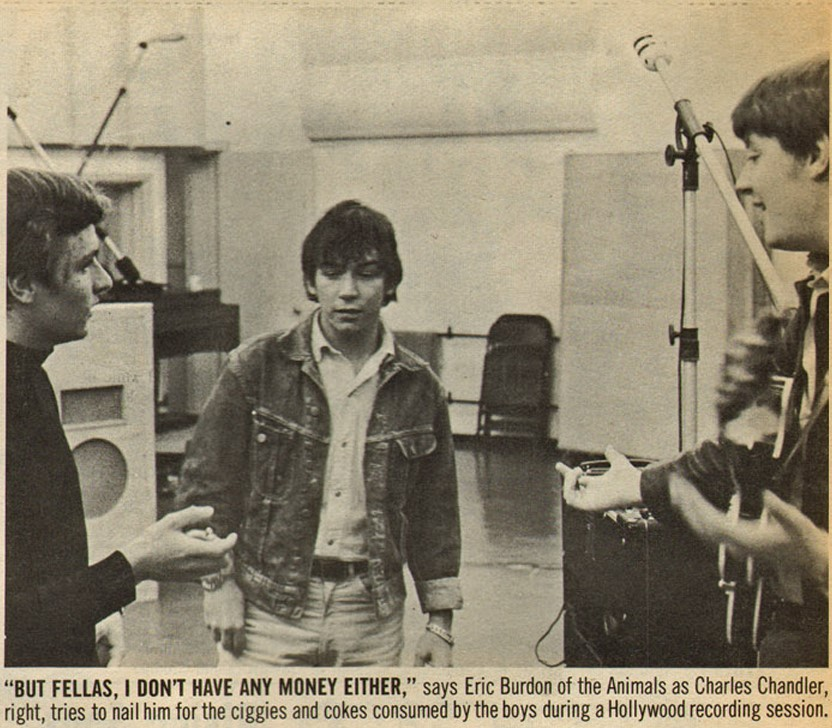
Chandler (right) with bandmate Eric Burdon (middle), featured in 2 December 1965 issue of KRLA Beat

After Eric Burdon joined the band, the Alan Price Trio was renamed The Animals. Chandler's bass lines were rarely given critical attention but some, including the opening riff of the group's 1965 hit "We Gotta Get Out of This Place" subsequently received praise. Chandler was also the most prominent of the group's backing vocalists and did occasional songwriting with Burdon. In 1966, despite commercial success, Chandler became disillusioned with the lack of money, recalling that, "We toured non-stop for three years, doing 300 gigs a year and we hardly got a penny." The original line-up dissolved in September 1966, and Burdon formed a new line-up known as "Eric Burdon and the Animals".

==== Reunions ====
In 1977, Chandler played and recorded with the original members of The Animals during a brief reunion and he joined them again for a further revival in 1983, at which point he sold his business interests, in order to concentrate on being a musician.

Chandler, with all but lead singer Eric Burdon of the classic members, was present at the band's induction into the Rock and Roll Hall of Fame in 1994.

=== Jimi Hendrix and Slade ===
After The Animals underwent personnel changes in 1966, Chandler turned to becoming a talent scout, artist manager, and record producer. During his final tour with The Animals, Chandler saw a then-unknown Jimi Hendrix play in Cafe Wha?, a Greenwich Village, New York City, nightclub. At the time Hendrix was performing under the name Jimmy James. In September, Chandler convinced Hendrix to accompany him to Britain, which was made possible with the help of Michael Jeffery, who suggested that he revert to his actual name, and later suggested naming the band the Jimi Hendrix Experience. In Britain, Chandler recruited bassist Noel Redding and drummer Mitch Mitchell as the other members of the Experience. Chandler's enthusiasm helped fuel Hendrix during the early days, but in 1968, halfway through the recording of Hendrix's third album, Electric Ladyland, personal and professional differences led to the end of their professional relationship.

Chandler was a key figure in Hendrix's rise to critical and commercial success. Chandler provided the young musician with living accommodation and financed the Experience's first single "Hey Joe", before they had a recording contract. He was also instrumental in introducing Hendrix to Eric Clapton. It was through this introduction that Hendrix was given the opportunity to play with Clapton and Cream on stage. It was Chandler's idea for Hendrix to set his guitar on fire, which made national news when this idea was used at a concert at the Finsbury Park Astoria Theatre and subsequently at the Monterey Pop festival. Hendrix's sound engineer Eddie Kramer later recalled that Chandler was very hands-on with the first two Hendrix albums, adding that "he [Chandler] was his [Hendrix's] mentor and I think it was very necessary."

By 1968, Chandler had become frustrated with the recording sessions for Hendrix's album Electric Ladyland, saying they were self-indulgent. Hendrix's management was left in the hands of Jeffery during the following year. Chandler then managed and produced the British rock band Slade for 12 years, during which they achieved six number one chart hits in the UK. Chandler and Slade parted company following the failure of the single "Knuckle Sandwich Nancy" in May 1981. He would, however negotiate their RCA contract which lasted for four new albums.

=== Nick Van Eede ===
Chandler discovered singer Nick Van Eede whilst he was working as a Hospital Porter in a Burns Unit. He subsequently signed him to his record label, Barn Records, as well as managed him. He released three singles in 1978 and 1979, but all failed to chart. Eede then would leave Chandler's management and form The Drivers in 1982, before disbanding in 1984. He would go on to form Cutting Crew in 1985 with Kevin MacMichael. They would go on to have the huge hit single "(I Just) Died In Your Arms" in 1986 (the single would reach number 1 in 19 countries including America).

=== Expansion of music industry interests ===
Chandler bought IBC Studios which he renamed Portland Recording Studios, after the studio address of 35 Portland Place, London and ran it for four years until he sold it to Don Arden. Chandler also ran a series of record labels from the studios including Barn Records, Six of the Best and Cheapskate Records. He formed a music publishing agency, as well as a production company and management companies. He also had a brief stint in which he produced the US rock group Horsepower, founded by American guitarist Mike Kennedy and Gary Marshall in 1978.

=== Other business ventures ===
During the early 1990s, he helped finance the development of Newcastle Arena, a 10,000 seat sports and entertainment venue which opened in 1995.

== Personal life ==
Chandler married twice and had a son by his first wife, Lotta, and a son and two daughters by his second wife, Madeleine Stringer.

Chandler stood 6 ft 4 in (1.93 m) tall.

Chandler died of an aortic aneurysm at Newcastle General Hospital on 17 July 1996.

== Honours ==
- Chandler was posthumously inducted into Hollywood's Rock Walk of Fame in May 2001 as a member of The Animals.
- Chandler's former home at 35 Second Avenue, Heaton, hosts a blue plaque placed on the wall by Newcastle City Council, which reads: "Chas Chandler 1938–1996. Founder member of the 'Animals'. Manager of Jimi Hendrix & Slade. Co-founder of Newcastle Arena. Lived in this house 1938–1964."
