= Don Powell =

English drummer (born 1946)

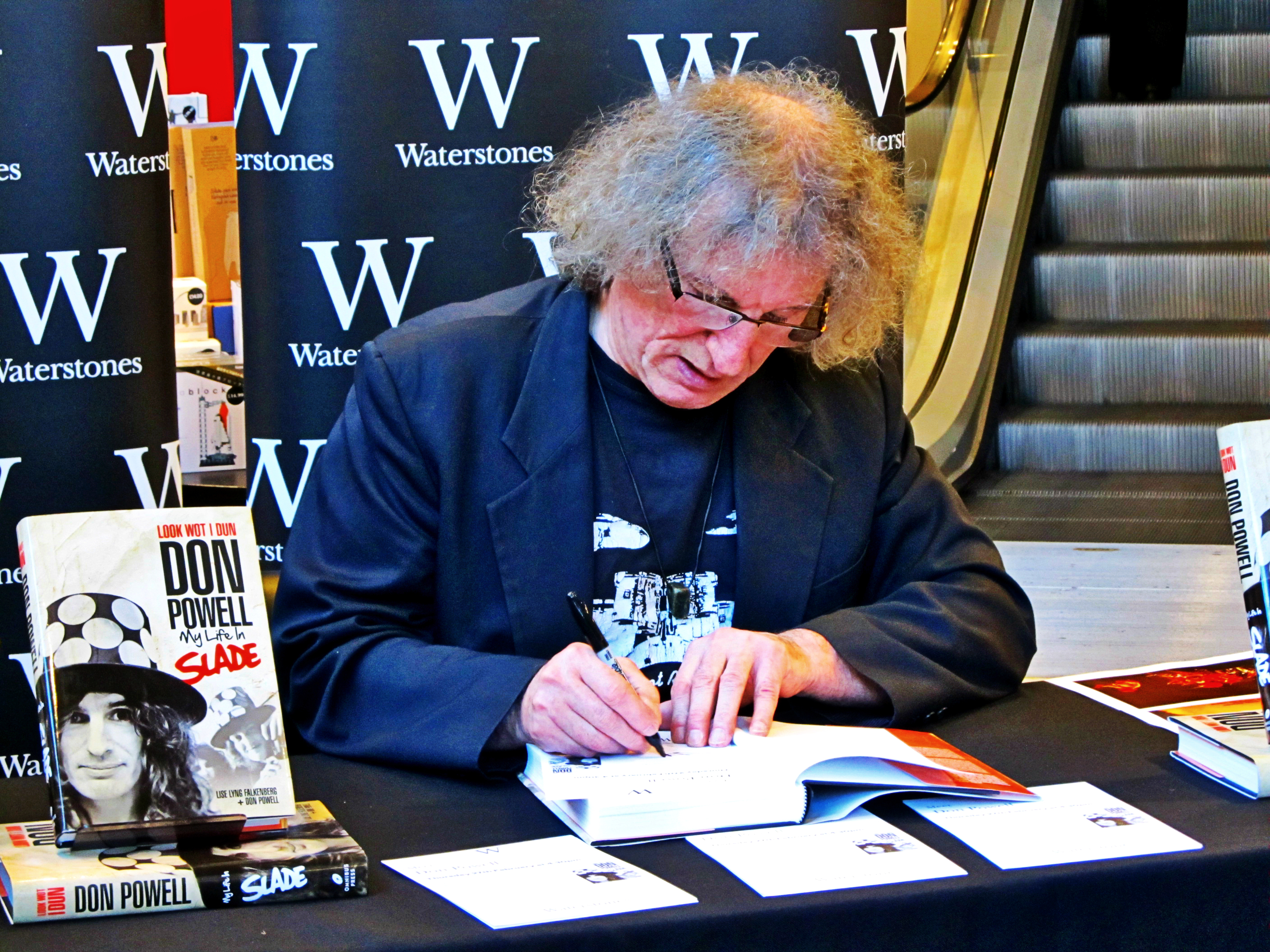
- Powell in 2014, signing copies of his biography Look Wot I Dun – My Life in Slade at the branch of Waterstones in Liverpool One

Background information
- Born: Donald George Powell; 10 September 1946 (age 79); Bilston, Staffordshire, England
- Genres: Glam rock; hard rock
- Occupation: Drummer
- Instruments: Drums; percussion
- Years active: 1960s–present
- Website: donpowellofficial.com

Donald George Powell (born 10 September 1946) is an English musician who was the drummer for glam rock and later hard rock group Slade for over fifty years, from 1966 until he was dismissed by Dave Hill in 2020.

== Early life ==
Powell was born in Bilston, near Wolverhampton, in 1946. His parents were Walter and Dora Powell; Walter was a steelworker, and Dora made electrical components. He has three siblings, a brother and two sisters. He attended Villiers Road Primary School from 1950 to 1957 and started to play drums for the Boy Scouts in 1958. He then attended Etheridge Secondary Modern School for Boys from 1957 to 1962, and studied metallurgy at Wednesbury Technical College in 1962.

== Career ==
He joined The Vendors in 1963, who in 1964 changed their name to The 'N Betweens; then to Ambrose Slade in 1969; and a few months later, on 24 October 1969, shortened that to Slade.

On 8 June 1973, Powell collapsed with heat exhaustion at the end of a show in Birmingham. He spent the night in hospital but was declared fit to play the following morning when discharged.

A long-time fan of Ringo Starr, Powell contributed the foreword to the 2016 book Ringo Starr and the Beatles Beat by Alex Cain and Terry McCusker. As the drummer with Colonel Bagshot, McCusker toured with Slade in the 1970s and the two have remained firm friends.

Powell collaborated with Lise Lyng Falkenberg on his biography since 2006, in part using the notebooks and diaries he kept due to his problems with short-term memory following his 1973 accident. The biography, titled Look Wot I Dun – My Life in Slade was released via the publisher Music Sales Ltd in October 2013. It covers in detail Slade's long career and Powell's life, which included booze-ups with Ozzy Osbourne. In 2013, Powell created his own website, and in early 2014 he published his diary entries for 1977 and 1978.

In February 2020, Powell announced that he had been fired by email by Dave Hill and would be forming Don Powell's Slade to perform Slade songs. The reason for Powell being dismissed wasn't officially given at the time. Noddy Holder eventually confirmed the reason for Powell being fired was because he had missed a few gigs because of an injury; on 28 December 2018 when at Peterborough station, he snapped tendons in both of his legs and was hospitalised for five weeks, eventually returning to performing again on 1 November 2019.

Powell had worried about his leg relapsing while on stage, and just two days after returning to the band following his injuries was advised by doctors that he would be crippled for life and be unable to walk if he did not stop drumming, but he refused and so Dave Hill reacted by firing him. According to Holder, many fans turned against Hill, and it affected him personally. Soon after departing from Slade, Powell's website mentioned that he was fit enough to play drums again. He formed "Don Powell's Slade".

== Car crash ==
In July of 1973, Slade were in the number-one position on the UK singles chart with "Skweeze Me, Pleeze Me". At 1:00 a.m. on Wednesday, 4 July 1973, Powell was severely injured in a serious car crash at Compton Road West, Wolverhampton, in which his 20-year-old fiancée, Angela Morris was killed instantly. On a bend in the road, the car hit a hedge and a road sign and then smashed into a wall. Both Powell and Morris had been ejected from the car, so it was impossible to tell who had been driving. Powell fractured his skull, both ankles and five ribs, and smashed several teeth. Surgeons had to drill into his skull to reduce the intracranial pressure. He remained unconscious for six days, and was therefore unable to attend Morris's cremation on 10 July.

Powell was discharged from the hospital on 30 July, and he was back recording with Slade by mid-August. When the Top 5 hit "My Friend Stan" was recorded, Powell was walking with the aid of a cane and had to be lifted onto his drum kit. The accident left Powell with no sense of taste or smell, and he still has severe problems with his short-term memory, whilst his long-term memory has remained unaffected.
