= Let's Dance (Chris Montez song) =

1962 single by Chris Montez

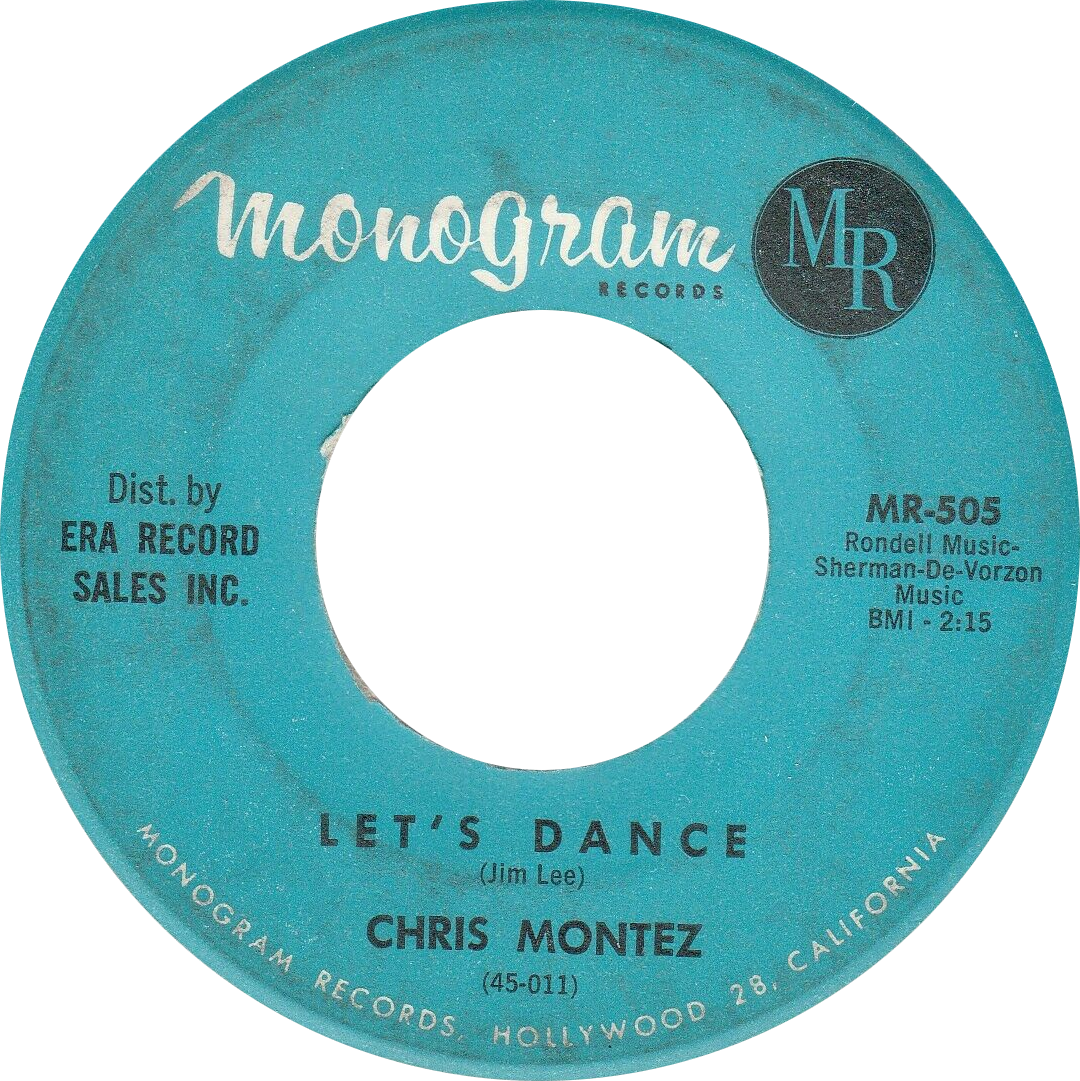
- Side A of US vinyl single

Single by Chris Montez
- B-side: "You're the One"
- Released: June 1962
- Recorded: 1962
- Genre: Rock and roll, garage rock
- Length: 2:22
- Label: Monogram
- Songwriter: Jim Lee
- Producer: Jim Lee

Chris Montez singles chronology
"Let's Dance" (1962)	"Some Kinda Fun" (1962)

"Let's Dance" is a 1962 rock‑and‑roll single by American singer Chris Montez, written and produced by Jim Lee. Released on Monogram Records, the song became an international hit, reaching No. 4 on the Billboard Hot 100 in the United States and No. 2 on the UK Singles Chart. The single re‑entered European charts in 1972, again reaching the top five in several countries.

The recording is built around a brisk dance beat, with electric guitar riffs and handclap patterns typical of early 1960s rock‑and‑roll. Montez’s vocal line follows a simple call‑and‑response structure, and the arrangement includes short instrumental breaks that mirror the dance‑step references in the lyrics.

== Original version ==
The song was written by Jim Lee, who produced and released the song on his own Monogram Records. The personnel on the original 1962 recording included Joel Hill on guitar, Ray Johnson on Philicorda organ, Ray Pohlman on bass guitar and Jesse Sailes on drums. When initially released, the song shot to No. 4 on the Billboard Hot 100 chart in the U.S., and to No. 2 on the UK Singles Chart. It became a big international hit, topping the charts in several countries, including Sweden.

In 1972 the song was coupled as an "oldie" with the Shirelles "Will You Love Me Tomorrow" and re-released in Europe. Based on radio play, the record company, London Records, quickly removed the Shirelles cut and replaced it with the original flip side "You're the One". Consequently, the recording reached the top five for a second time, in both Britain and Germany. It was also the title track of a 1972 album by Montez.

=== Charts ===
Chart (1962)	Peak position
Austria (Ö3 Austria Top 40)	12
Belgium (Ultratop 50 Flanders)	1
Belgium (Ultratop 50 Wallonia)	6
Netherlands (Single Top 100)	3
Germany (GfK)	7
New Zealand (Lever Hit Parade)	4
Norway (VG-lista)	2
Sweden (Kvällstoppen)	1
Sweden (Tio i Topp)	1
UK Singles (Official Charts)	2
US Billboard Hot 100	4
US Hot R&B/Hip-Hop Songs (Billboard)	15

== Ola and the Janglers version ==
"Let's Dance"

Single by Ola and Janglers

from the album Let's Dance
- B-side: "Hear Me"
- Released: September 1968
- Recorded: 1968
- Genre: Garage rock
- Length: 2:25
- Label: Gazell
- Songwriter: Jim Lee
- Producer: Gunnar Bergström

Ola and Janglers singles chronology
"Tracks Of My Tears" (1968)	"Let's Dance" (1968)	"California Sun" (1969)

Throughout 1968, Swedish band Ola and the Janglers chart success had started waning. Between January and March of that year, they had released three singles; all of them failed to chart on both Kvällstoppen and Tio i Topp. The band's lead singer, Ola Håkansson, found the song while listening to Kvällstoppen on Sveriges Radio P3 in 1962, when Chris Montez original single reached number one in Sweden. Though they never incorporated it into their setlist at the time, upon their chart success waining they thought it was a good song to record as a single. It was recorded with Sonet Records owner Gunnar Bergström producing. The B-side, "Hear Me", was written by the band's guitarist Claes af Geijerstam, which features distinct influences from baroque pop and a similar chord progression to the Kinks "Sunny Afternoon". The single got released in Sweden in September 1968 through the Sonet sub-label Gazell Records.

It became the Janglers last hit when it entered Tio i Topp at a position of six on October 19, 1968. It peaked on top of the chart on November 9, staying there for four weeks until "Little Arrows" by Leapy Lee replaced it on December 7. It was last seen at a position of number 12 on January 25, 1969. The song debuted on Kvällstoppen on November 5, 1968 at a position of 11, before peaking at number one on December 3, staying on the top for a week. It exited on January 28, 1969 after spending 13 weeks on the charts. The single was released in April 1969 in both the United States and the United Kingdom, through GNP Crescendo and Sonet Records respectively. To the surprise of Håkansson, it started selling well in California which led to it charting nationally. It entered the Billboard Hot 100 on May 31, 1969 before peaking at number 92 on June 7, dropping out that same week.

The success of the single was so sudden that the album which it appears on was originally going to be titled Fingertip before Gazell decided to name it after the song. Similarly, the Swedish sleeve for the single was issued in over ten different colors and variations because of the countless re-presses which has led to some copies becoming collector items. Despite the unexpected chart success of the single, Ola and the Janglers called it quits in December 1968. According to Håkansson, "It was a feather in my cap, but then I got tired. We had toured both in Sweden and abroad. You felt like you were just sitting in a touring car and living in a hotel room." Although Siw Malmkvist's song "Sole Sole Sole" with Umberto Marcato had reached the Billboard chart in 1964, it was billed a solo single and as such "Let's Dance" marked the first time a Swedish group charted in the US, something Håkansson said "other groups could only dream of at the time."

=== Personnel ===
- Ola Håkansson – lead vocals, handclaps, tambourine
- Johannes "Jonte" Olsson – hammond organ, backing vocals
- Åke Eldsäter – bass guitar
- Claes af Geijerstam – lead and rhythm guitar, backing vocals
- Leif Johansson – drums, percussion

=== Charts ===
Chart (1968–1969)	Peak position
Belgium (Ultratop)	10
Canada (RPM) Top Singles	100
Denmark (Salgshitlisterne Top 20)	1
Denmark (Tipparaden)	7
Sweden (Tio i Topp)	1
Sweden (Kvällstoppen)	1
US Billboard Hot 100	92
US Cashbox Top 100	91
US Record World 100 Top Pops	92

== Slade version ==
"Let's Dance"

Single by Slade

from the album Crackers
- B-side: "Standing on the Corner"
- Released: 28 November 1988
- Recorded: 1985
- Genre: Hard rock, pop rock
- Length: 2:40
- Label: Cheapskate
- Songwriter: Jim Lee
- Producer: Jim Lea

Slade singles chronology
"We Won't Give In" (1987)	"Let's Dance" (1988)	"Radio Wall of Sound" (1991)

Official audio
- "Let's Dance" by Slade on YouTube

"Let's Dance" was covered by English rock band Slade in 1985 for their studio/compilation album Crackers. In 1988, the band released their version as a single through their label Cheapskate. It failed to reach the top 100 of the UK Singles Chart. The version was produced by bassist Jim Lea (not to be confused with Jim Lee, the song's writer and of whom produced Montez's original).

=== Background ===
Slade were largely inactive in 1988 after the band members agreed to take an 18-month break and pursue their own interests. Towards the end of the year, the band made a "last minute" decision to release a single in the UK through their independent label, Cheapskate. They chose to release their cover of "Let's Dance", taken from their 1985 studio/compilation album Crackers. Given the name "1988 Remix", the single failed to gain sufficient radio airplay and failed to reach the top 100 of the UK Singles Chart, stalling at number 152.

In a 1989 interview with Guitarist, guitarist Dave Hill recalled of the track, "We just did a rock version of it for a laugh and thought we'd stick it out." Speaking of the band's decision to release it as a single, Holder revealed in a 1989 fan club interview, "We thought it was a good track. We decided that [it] stood a good chance of getting some airplay so we decided to put the record out but it wasn't the case. Only the commercial stations like Piccadilly and some of the others played it regularly but without Radio One, you're sunk."

=== Release ===
"Let's Dance" was released in the UK on 7-inch vinyl and 3-inch CD by Cheapskate on 28 November 1988. The B-side, "Standing on the Corner", is a track from the band's 1974 album Slade in Flame. The CD format featured an additional two tracks from Slade in Flame, "Far Far Away" and "How Does It Feel".

=== Critical reception ===
Upon its release, the single was reviewed on the BBC Radio 1 programme Singled Out, where those who reviewed the single were producers Stock, Aitken, and Waterman. All three reminisced about the band with DJ Mike Read and stated what a great band they were. Mike Stock also remarked that Noddy Holder was the greatest rock 'n' roll singer since John Lennon.

=== Formats ===
7-inch single

1. "Let's Dance" (1988 Remix) – 2:40
2. "Standing on the Corner" – 4:54

CD single

1. "Let's Dance" (1988 Remix) – 2:40
2. "Far Far Away" – 3:37
3. "How Does It Feel" – 5:55
4. "Standing on the Corner" – 4:54

=== Personnel ===
Slade

- Noddy Holder – lead vocals
- Jim Lea – synthesiser, bass, backing vocals
- Dave Hill – lead guitar, backing vocals
- Don Powell – drums

Production

- Jim Lea – production ("Let's Dance")
- Chas Chandler – production ("Standing on the Corner", "Far Far Away" and "How Does It Feel")

Other

- Intro – sleeve design

=== Charts ===
Chart (1988)	Peak position
UK Singles Chart	152
UK Top Indie Singles (Music Week)	28

== Other notable covers ==
British rock band Status Quo included "Let's Dance" in their 1990 medley "The Anniversary Waltz (Part One)", which was a hit throughout Europe and hit #2 on the UK Singles Chart.

"Let's Dance" was the 12th track on American punk rock band the Ramones debut album, Ramones.
