= Nobody's Fool =

Nobody's Fool(s) may refer to:

== Film, television and fiction ==
- Nobody's Fool (1921 film), a silent film starring Marie Prevost
- Nobody's Fool (1936 film), a film starring Glenda Farrell
- Nobody's Fool (1986 film), a film starring Rosanna Arquette and Eric Roberts
- Nobody's Fool (1994 film), a film starring Paul Newman
- Nobody's Fool (2018 film), a film starring Tiffany Haddish and Tika Sumpter
- Nobody's Fool (TV series), a 2026 British TV series
- Nobody's Fool (novel), a novel by Richard Russo, basis for the 1994 film
- "Nobody's Fool", an episode of the 2003 TV series Teenage Mutant Ninja Turtles

== Music ==
=== Albums ===
- Nobody's Fool, a 1973 album, and title song, by Dan Penn
- Nobody's Fool, an unreleased album by Edwin "Lil' Eddie" Serrano
- Nobody's Fool, an album by Norman Wisdom
- Nobody's Fool, a 2022 album by Joanne Shaw Taylor

=== Songs ===
- "Nobody's Fool", a charting single by Jim Reeves, 1970 (see Jim Reeves discography)
- "Nobody's Fool" (Slade song), 1976
- "Nobody's Fool" (Cinderella song), 1986
- "Nobody's Fool" (Kenny Loggins song), theme from the 1988 film Caddyshack II
- "Nobody's Fool" (Haircut One Hundred song), 1982
- "Nobody's Fool" (Richie Furay song) from the Poco album, Pickin' Up the Pieces
- "Nobody's Fool", a song by Avril Lavigne from Let Go
- "Nobody's Fool", a song by Blackhawk from Love & Gravity
- "Nobody’s Fool", by Brad Paisley from the Cars 2 soundtrack

== See also ==
- Nobody's Fools, a 1976 album by Slade
