= In for a Penny =

Single by Slade

from the album Nobody's Fools
- B-side: "Can You Just Imagine"
- Released: 14 November 1975
- Genre: Rock
- Length: 3:34
- Label: Polydor
- Songwriters: Noddy Holder; Jim Lea
- Producer: Chas Chandler

Slade singles chronology
"Thanks for the Memory (Wham Bam Thank You Mam)" (1975)	"In for a Penny" (1975)	"Let's Call It Quits" (1976)

Audio sample
- file; help

"In for a Penny" is a song by English rock band Slade, released in 1975 as the lead single from their sixth studio album, Nobody's Fools. The song was written by lead vocalist Noddy Holder and bassist Jim Lea, and was produced by Chas Chandler. It reached number 11 in the UK Singles Chart and remained in the top 50 for eight weeks.

== Background ==
By 1975, Slade felt their success in the UK and Europe had plateaued. The band and their manager, Chas Chandler, decided their next career move should be to break into the American market. The band agreed to relocate and build a reputation for their live performances from the ground up, much like they had done in the UK. In between touring, the band recorded their next album, Nobody's Fools, which saw the band move towards a more "American" soul/pop sound in attempt to gain a commercial break on the American charts. "In for a Penny" was released as the lead single in November 1975, and reached No. 11 in the UK.

In a 1986 fan club interview, Hill spoke of the song in relation to it being released as the album's lead single: "When we came back from touring in the States and released that, I think a lot of fans were disappointed, though I personally liked the track. They thought we'd come back with something heavy, so it may have seemed lightweight to them." "In for a Penny" is notable for guitarist Dave Hill's guitar solo being his longest heard on a Slade single. Just before the second guitar solo in the track, Holder shouts the line "Gee, they got a band", which was a reference to a British TV advert in which a female character mistakes the entrance of threatening gangsters carrying violin cases for the arrival of a music combo.

== Release ==
"In for a Penny" was released on 7" vinyl by Polydor Records in the UK, Ireland, Germany, France, Belgium, Sweden, the Netherlands, Spain, Portugal, Scandinavia, Yugoslavia, Australia and Japan. The B-side, "Can You Just Imagine", was exclusive to the single and would later appear on the band's 2007 compilation B-Sides.

== Promotion ==
In the UK, the band performed the song on the TV shows Top of the Pops and Supersonic. The song's performance on Top of the Pops has not surfaced since its original broadcast. In 1986, Lea recalled returning to Britain to perform the song on the show and the following day when the band watched their performance at Freddie Mercury's flat. On the same show, Queen appeared with "Bohemian Rhapsody" and Lea remembered being "totally knocked out" watching their video, while Mercury did not realise what an achievement his group had made.

== Critical reception ==
Upon its release, Ray Fox-Cumming of Record Mirror & Disc called "In for a Penny" a "good Beatles-ish kind of tune, with a "good lyric" and a "modest arrangement" which features "some nice melodic guitar breaks" and "harmonies [which] are perhaps the best thing Slade have ever done". He concluded, "This shows the group breaking new territory and doing it very well." The Lurgan Mail noted the "slick guitar work from Dave Hill" and remarked that the "emphasis seems to be on the instrumental rather than the lyrical content". John Hutson of the Thanet Times felt he "can't make up my mind about it", believing the single to be "probably too slow, but catchy enough to get played". He also noted how Hill's guitar work "weaves in and out of the song most effectively". Chris Mosey of the Dorset Evening Echo noted the "shades of Sgt. Pepper" and the "raucous Noddy Holder vocal".

Deborah Thomas of the Daily Mirror felt Slade's "happy-go-luckiness gives way to a heavier, rougher sound" on "In for a Penny" and considered the B-side, "Can You Just Imagine", to be "more catchy". The Lincoln, Rutland & Stamford Mercury wrote, "They have been out of the charts for some time. This may not be the one to get them back in." The Shepherds Bush Gazette and Hammersmith Post described it as having a "relaxed feel with an attractive tune" and believed it would "probably reach the lower steps of the top twenty", but the reviewer also added that "it's not really the Slade that fans came to know and love three years ago". The reviewer continued, "One may well wonder why Slade have recently been putting out slowish, melodic records instead of the heavy metal base that took them to the top of the charts." Ian MacDonald of the NME stated that Slade were "now irredeemably on remote control" with a song "completely hollow, a disorientated groping for past energies in the shape of a plodding tune and transparently automatic lyrics".

== Track listing ==
7-inch single

1. "In for a Penny" – 3:34
2. "Can You Just Imagine" – 3:31

== Personnel ==
Slade

- Noddy Holder – lead vocals, guitar
- Dave Hill – lead guitar, backing vocals
- Jim Lea – bass, accordion, backing vocals
- Don Powell – drums

Production

- Chas Chandler – producer

== Charts ==
Chart performance for "In for a Penny"
Chart (1975)	Peak position
Belgium (Ultratop 50 Wallonia)	39
Ireland (IRMA)	12
Netherlands (Tipparade)	14
Sweden (Sverigetopplistan)	14
UK Singles (OCC)	11
