= Weymouth Harbour Tramway =

Former street-running railway in Dorset, England

Coordinates: 50°36′53″N 2°27′22″W

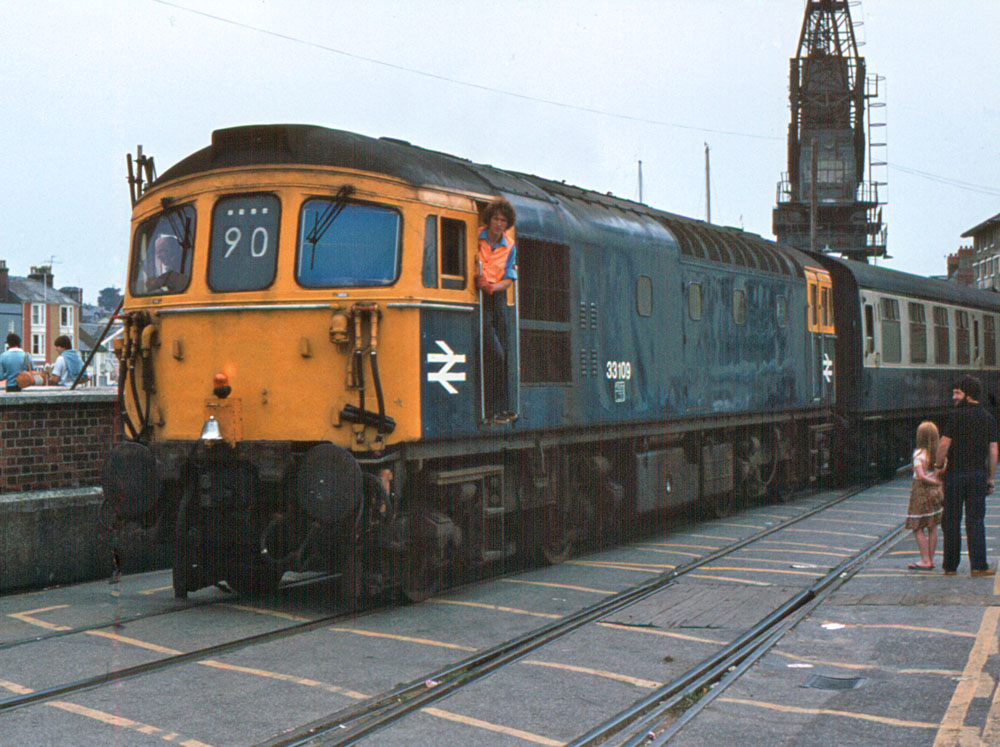
The tramway in use in 1981

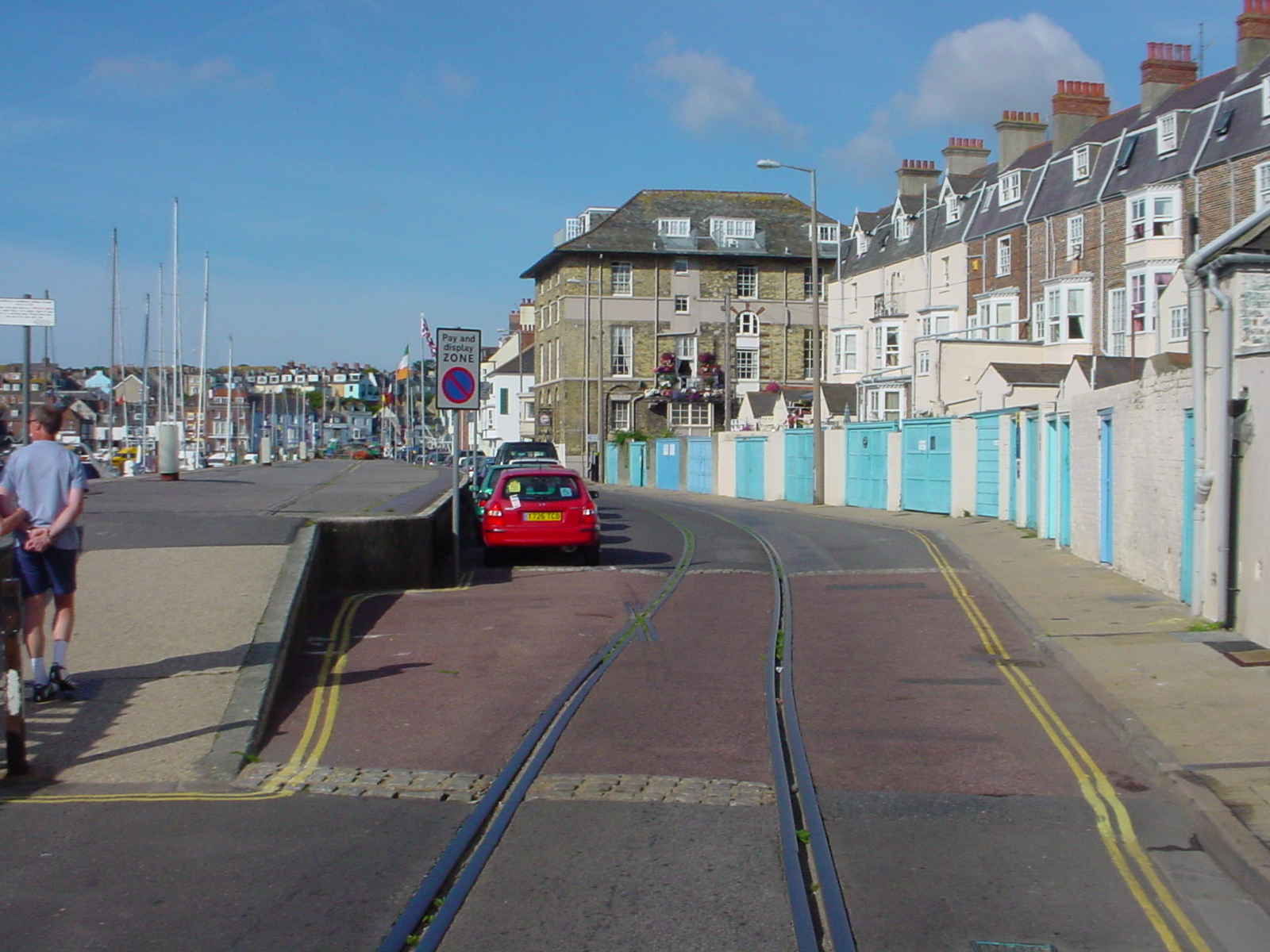
Near the former cargo loading stage, 2005

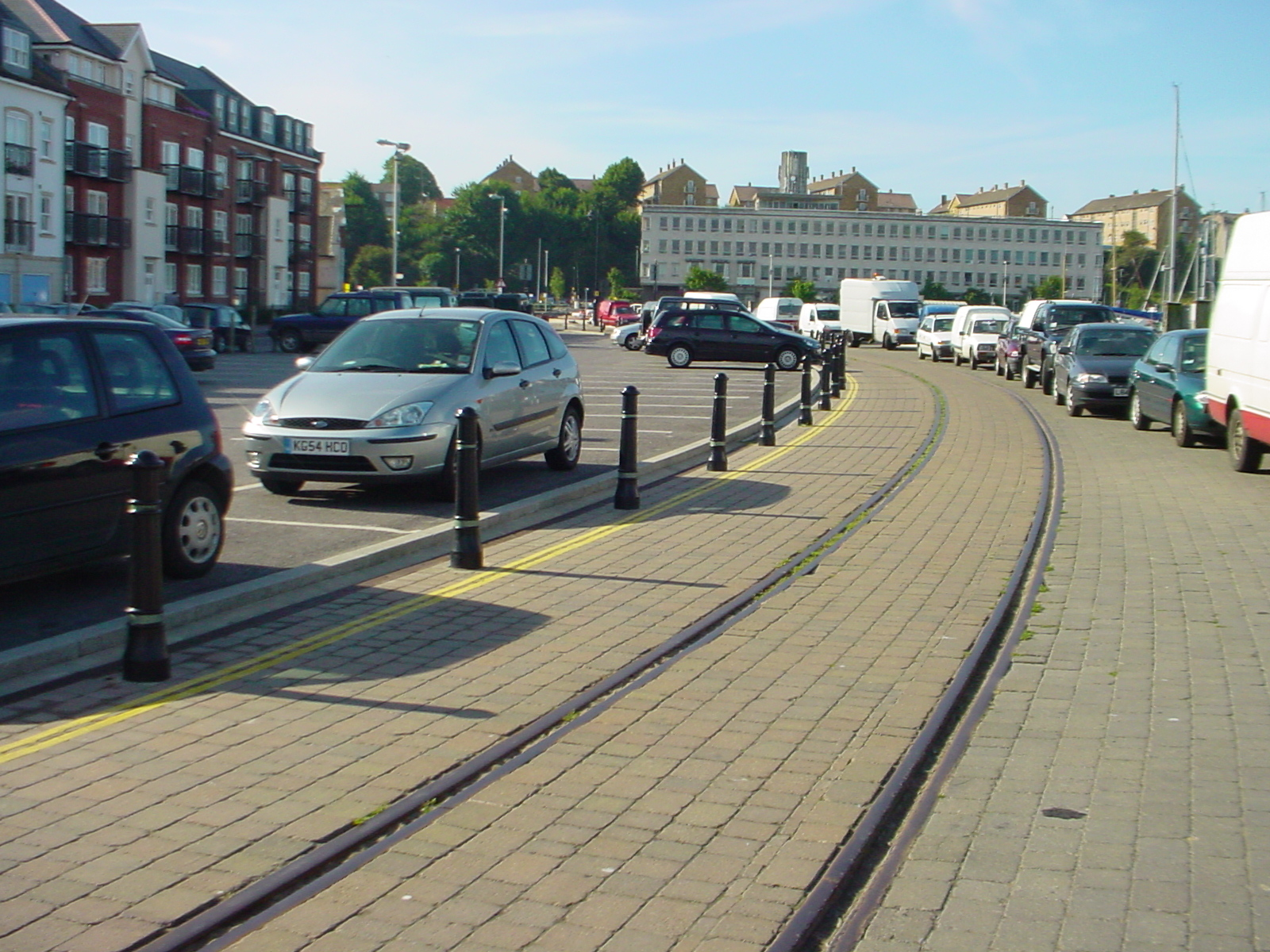
The Tramway 1938 curve

The Weymouth Harbour Tramway (also known as the Quay Branch or Harbour Line) was a heavy rail line running entirely on the streets of Weymouth, Dorset, England from a junction to the north of Weymouth station to Weymouth Quay station at Weymouth Harbour. Built in 1865, it was last used for timetabled British Rail services in 1987 with the last special train running in May 1999. The line was dismantled in 2020–21. Only small sections of the street running tracks remain along with around 500m of the tracks linking to the mainline.

== History ==
Opened in 1865 by the Great Western Railway, the harbour tramway ran from a junction north of the main station, through the streets adjacent to the Backwater and the harbour, to the quay. Passenger trains began in 1889, transporting travellers to Channel Island ferries.

As freight traffic grew, several sidings and loops were added to the main line to serve harbourside businesses. The Town Bridge was rebuilt in 1930, and the tramway initially routed through the northern arch. Between 1938 and 1939 the tight curve between the Backwater and harbour was supplanted by a new curve on a newly-infilled section of the quayside and the tramway was relocated to the outer arch of the bridge, where it remained until its removal.

The track layout at the Quay station was gradually increased from a single track, to a double-track layout up to 1961, and finally a three-track arrangement which persisted till the end of regular traffic, albeit in a truncated layout from 1973. Regular goods traffic ceased in 1972, although fuel oil was transported to a facility at the pier until 1983. Regular passenger services ceased in 1987 when the South West Main Line into Weymouth was provided with third rail electrification, which was incompatible with street running and then diesel locos would have to be stationed there to switch over.

There were some experiments in September 1996 with a flywheel-powered vehicle (see Parry People Movers), but this did not result in permanent traffic on the tramway. The last use of the branch was on 2 May 1999 for a special Pathfinder Tours charter. This was the first train to use the line since 1995.

== Operations ==
Trains operating over public thoroughfare tramway without escort were required to be fitted with warning equipment for the general public.

During operation of services by Class 33 locomotives, two warning units were built and housed in a cabinet at the track side entrance to the tramway at the throat of Weymouth yard. This equipment comprised a yellow box which fitted on a lamp bracket on the cab front, and had an amber rotating beacon and bell which served to warn thoroughfare users. The bell did not ring continuously but could be controlled by the train driver. Each member of Class 33/1 and all TC stock had a small socket where the bell/beacon units plugged in to draw power from the train systems. Trains for the quay would halt at the station throat, the warning equipment attached and then tested by the train guard. In addition, trains on the tramway were "walked" by railway staff with flags, clearing the route of people and badly parked cars all the way between the points at which the tramway reverted to conventional track at the quay station and road crossing into Weymouth yard. On arrival at the quay terminus the guard would move the warning equipment to the other end of the train in readiness for the return journey.

On occasions trains were escorted by the British Transport Police.

== 21st century ==
In January 2009 it was reported that Weymouth and Portland Borough Council wished to remove the tramway, and that Network Rail had confirmed it had little wish for its retention. In February 2009, the council agreed to purchase the line from Network Rail for £50,000, prior to a final decision on its future. However, it was reported in July 2014 that the sale of the line never went through and a campaign started to reopen the tram route claiming it would help with tourism and reduce car usage in the town. In August 2015 a report appeared in the Dorset Echo saying that a petition online had been set up to reopen the line. In February 2016 the council bid for the tramway to be put into a permanent out-of-use status. The Office of Road and Rail agreed to the permanent closure in 2017.

In January 2019, the Campaign for Better Transport released a report identifying the line was listed as priority 2 for reopening. Priority 2 is for those lines which require further development or a change in circumstances (such as housing developments).

In February 2020, the Department for Transport provided funding to facilitate the removal of the track. Removal of the tracks through the town began on 5 October 2020.

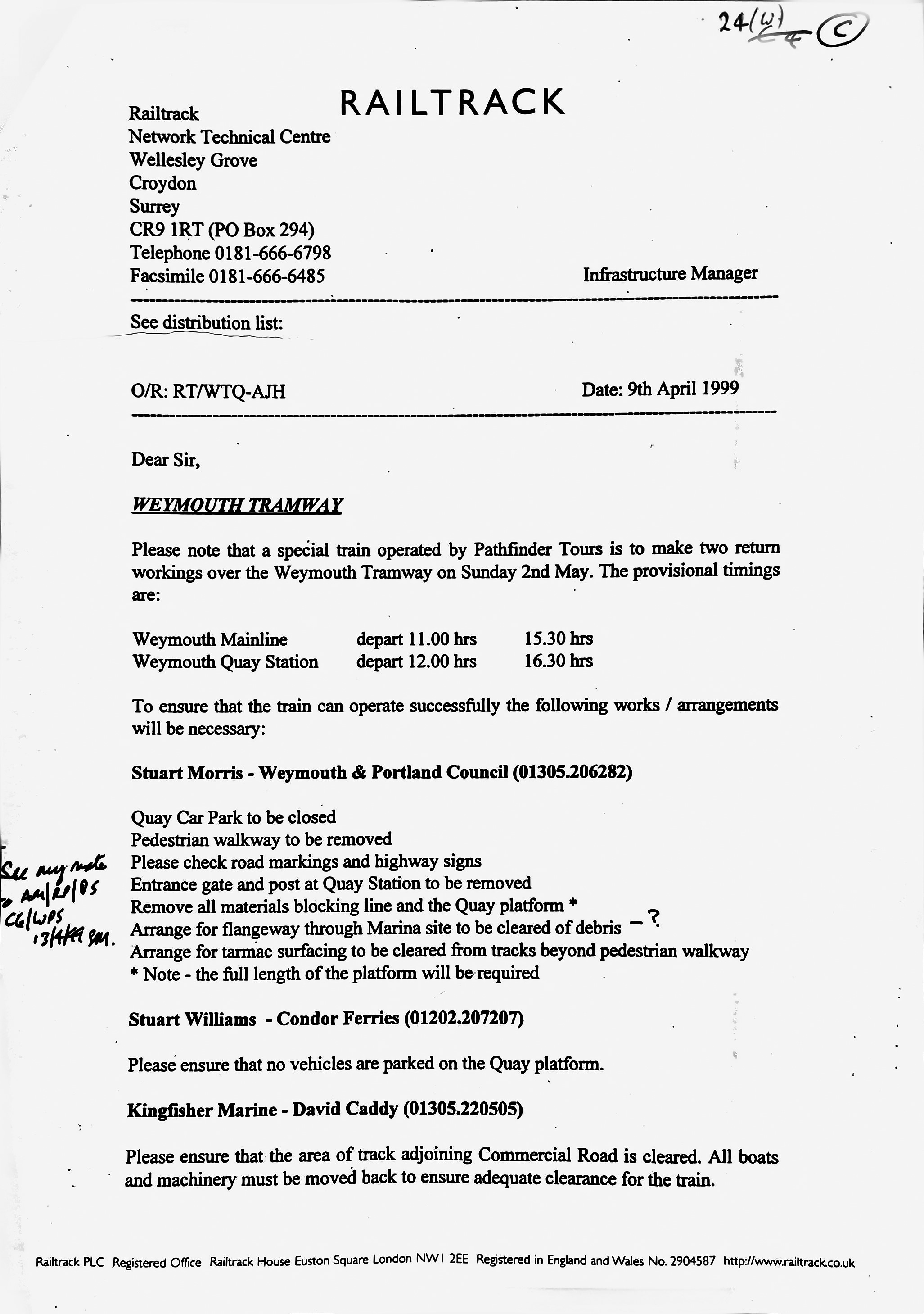
Railtrack letter requiring works to clear the line 1999

== Domesday Project ==
The branch was included in the 1986 BBC Domesday Project; 25 years later it was revisited and is incorporated into the reborn, online project.

== Calls for heritage operations ==
Many felt that the line should be retained for heritage operations, but Dorset Council and Weymouth Town Council refused.

The council's reasonings were;

1. The line did not follow a dedicated right-of-way
2. The line crossed into opposite traffic directions multiple times along the route
3. There were no intermediate stations until the final disused station at Weymouth Harbour and the main National Rail station
4. The sleepers on which the rails were placed are unsuitable for heavy and light rail usage
5. There is no electrical supply (overhead or third rail) to the track
6. There is no safety infrastructure at any point

The councils stated that lengths of track not in the roadway were left in place for heritage reasons, but parts on the roadway were removed for safety reasons.

== Gallery ==
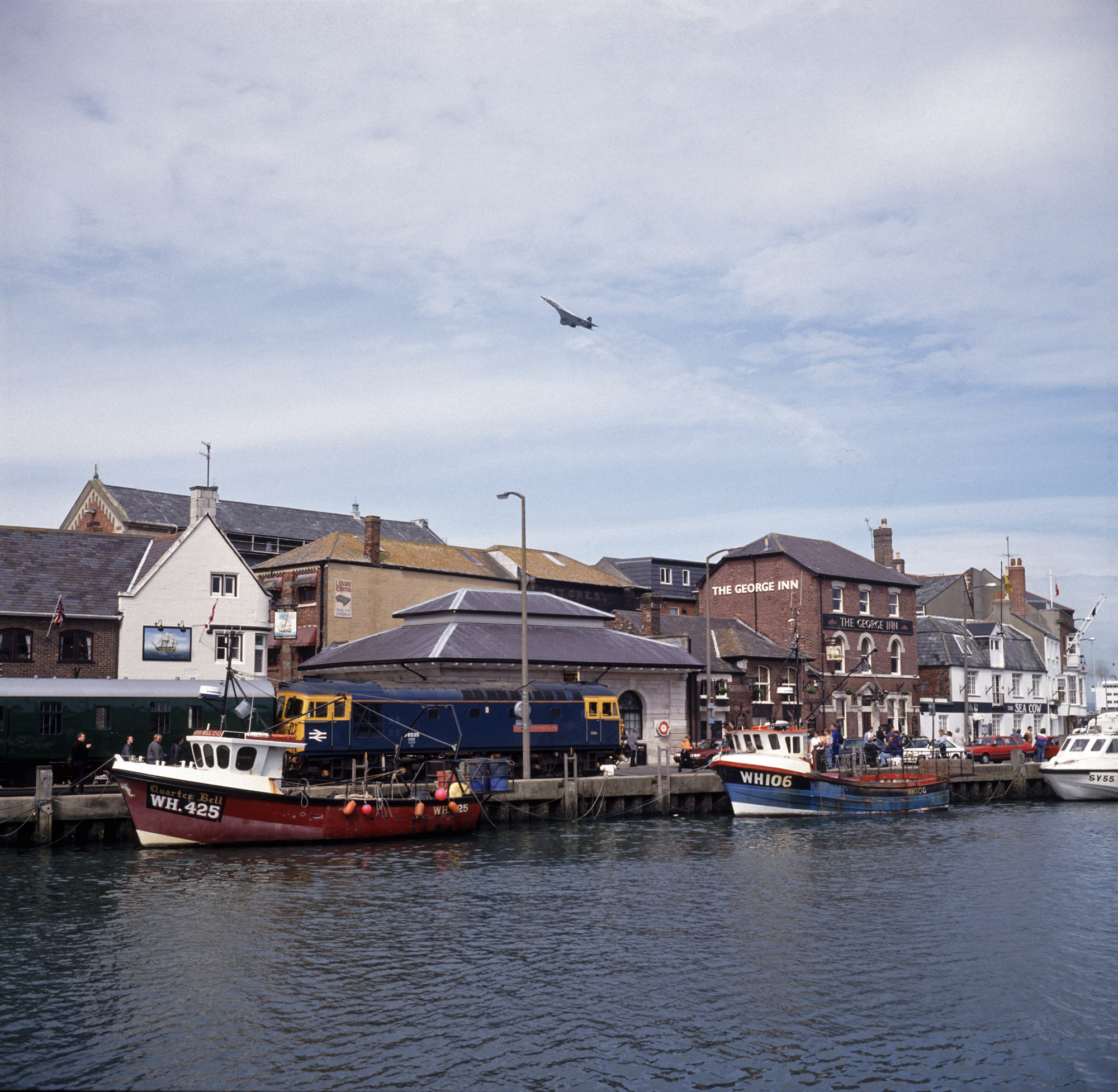
Passenger train passing between fishing boats and buildings in 1994, with Concorde overhead

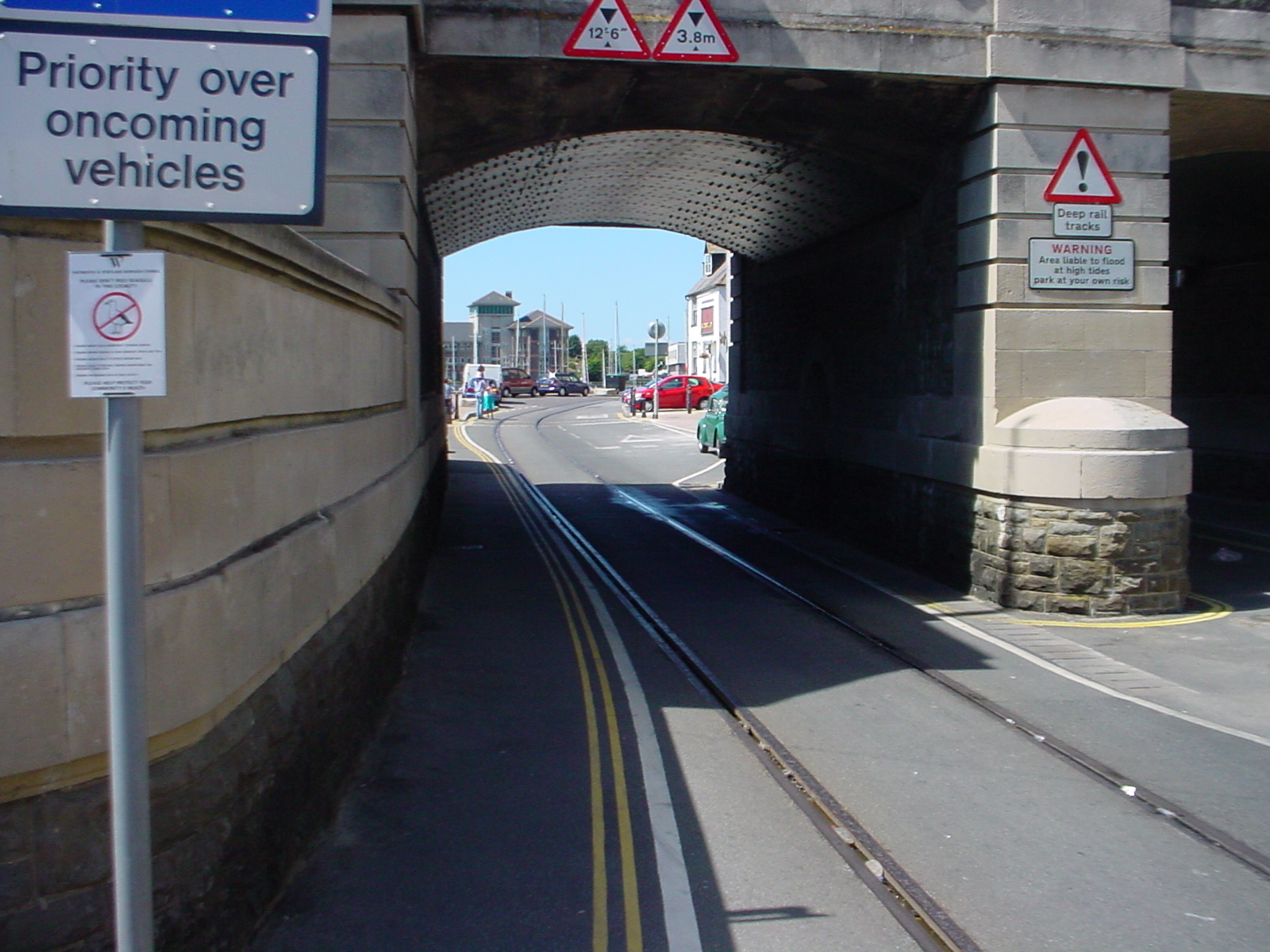
Under The Town Bridge, 2005

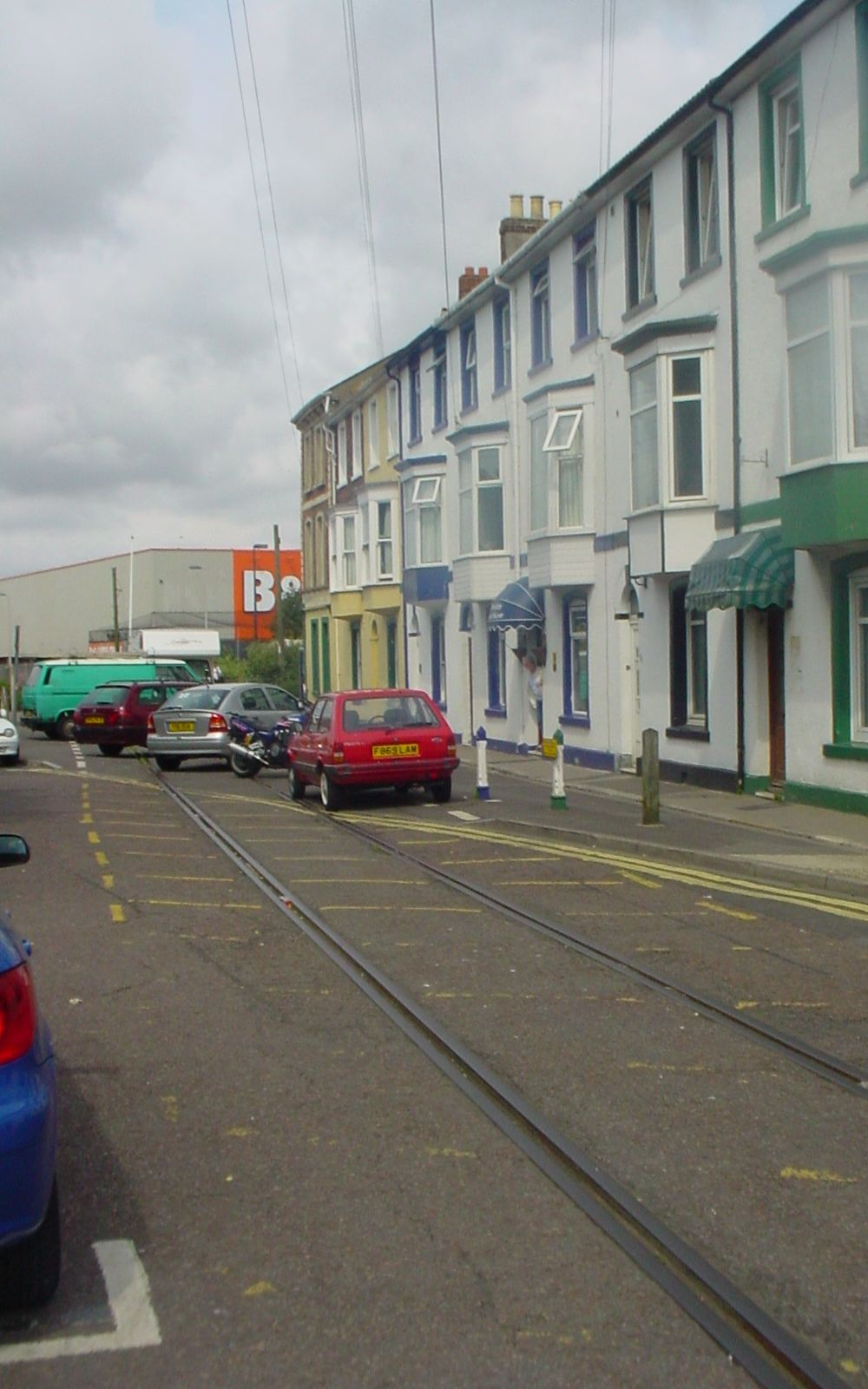
Jubilee Crescent, 2006

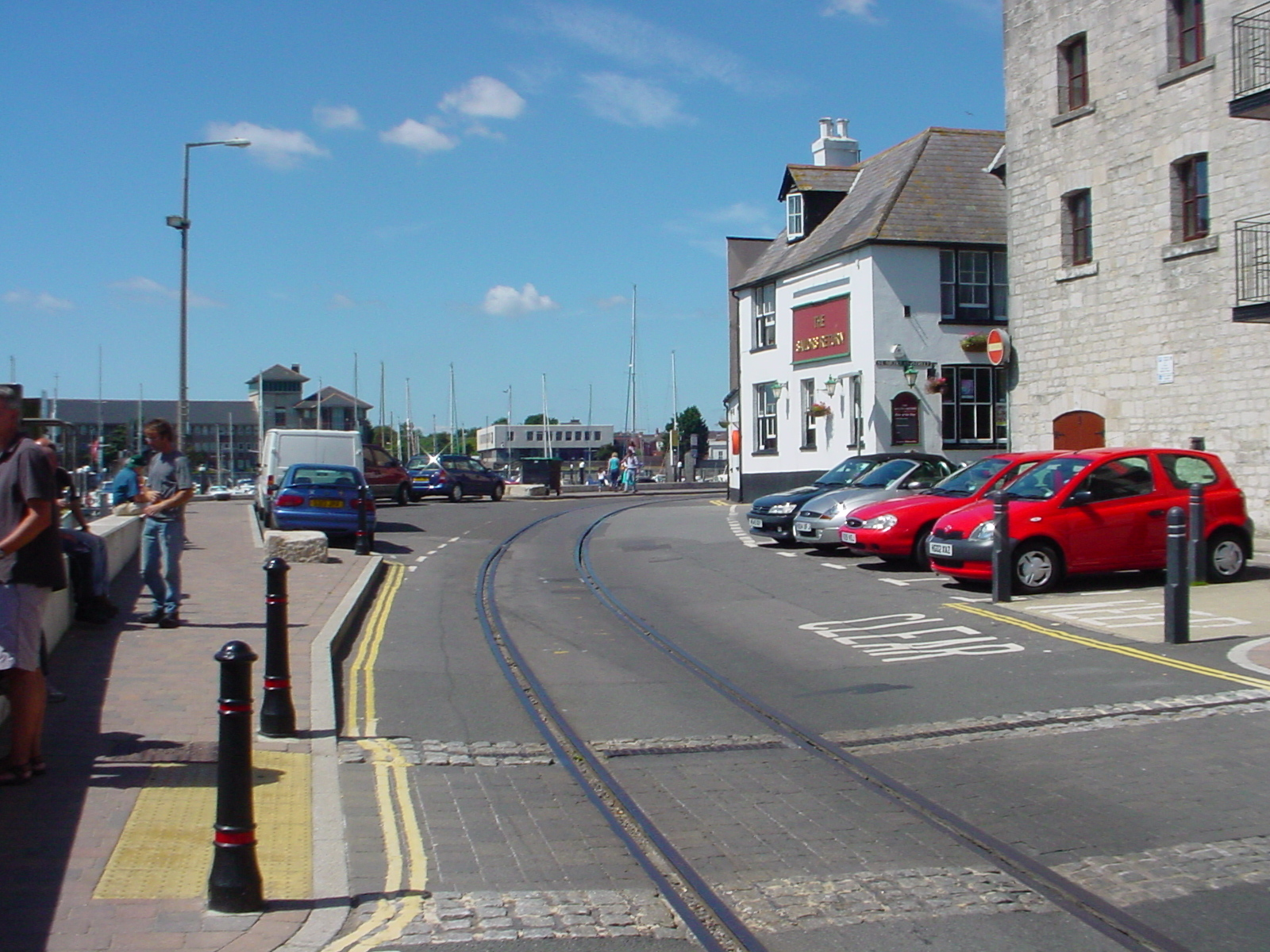
Near Ferry's Corner in 2005

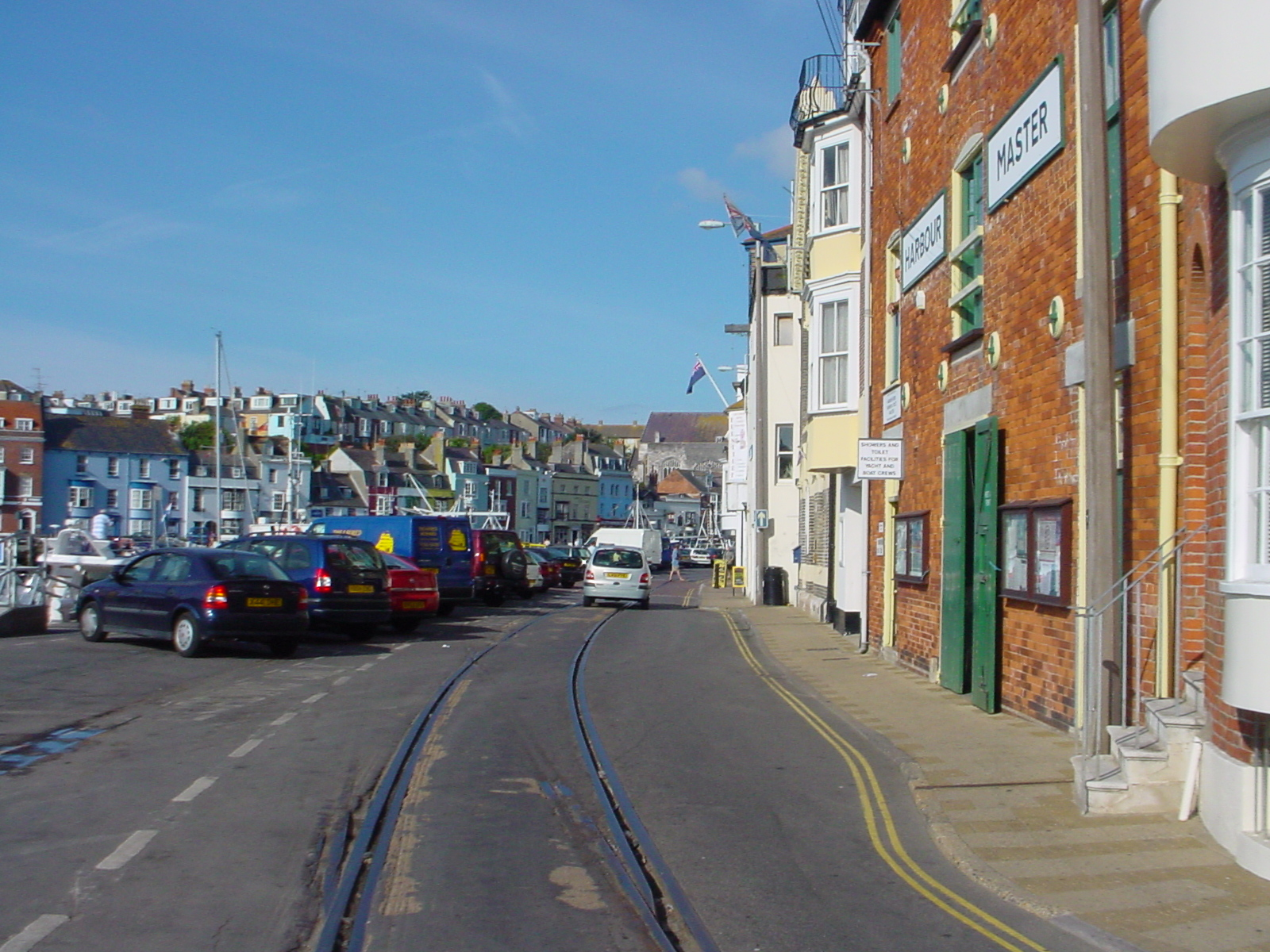
Near Custom House, Summer 2005

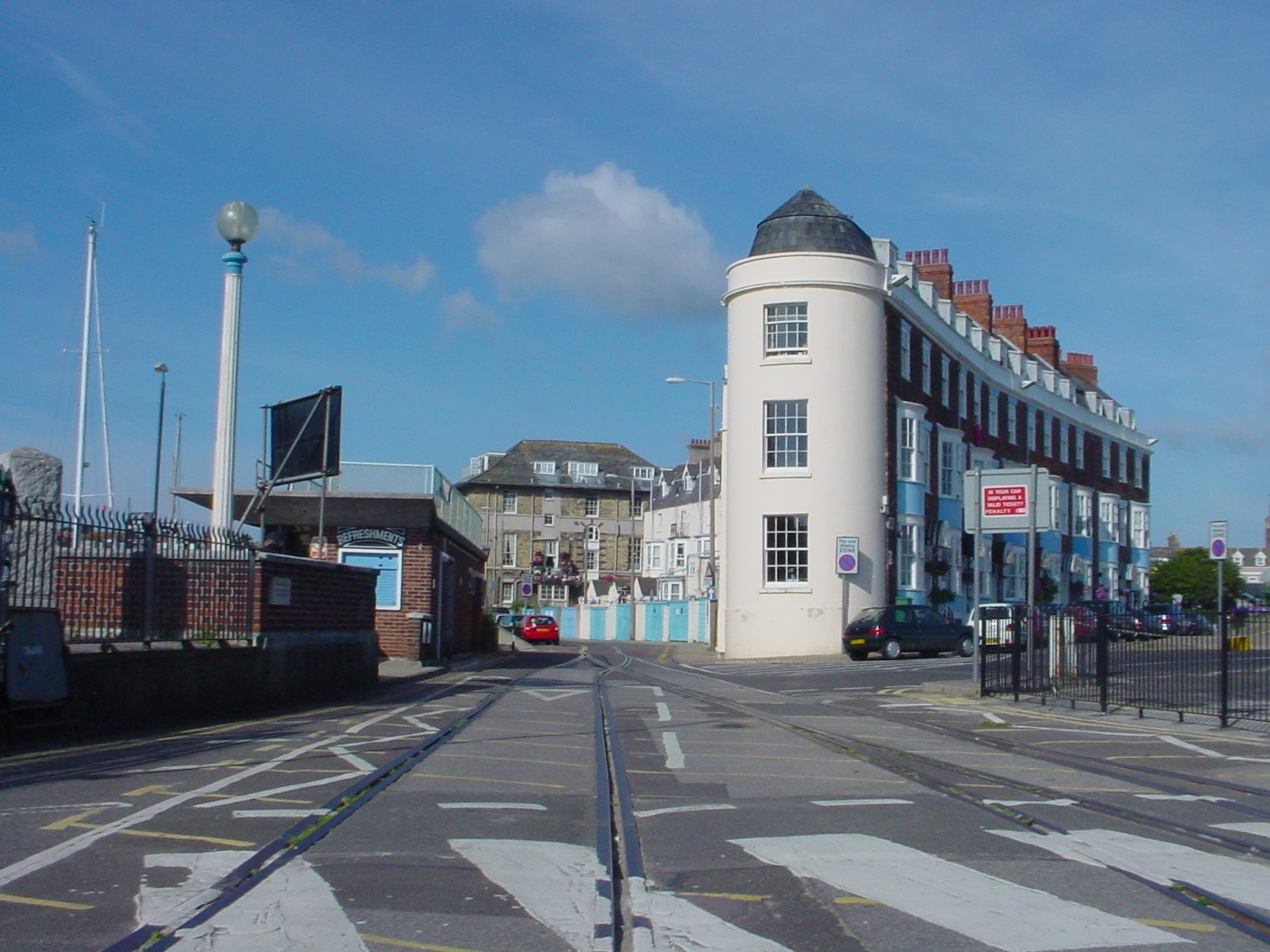
Looking from the station area

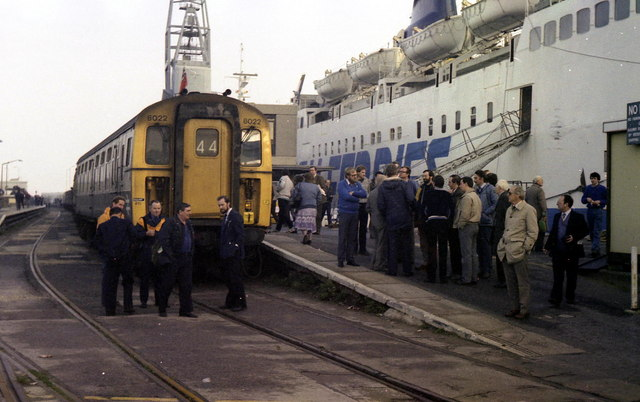
The harbour station 1986

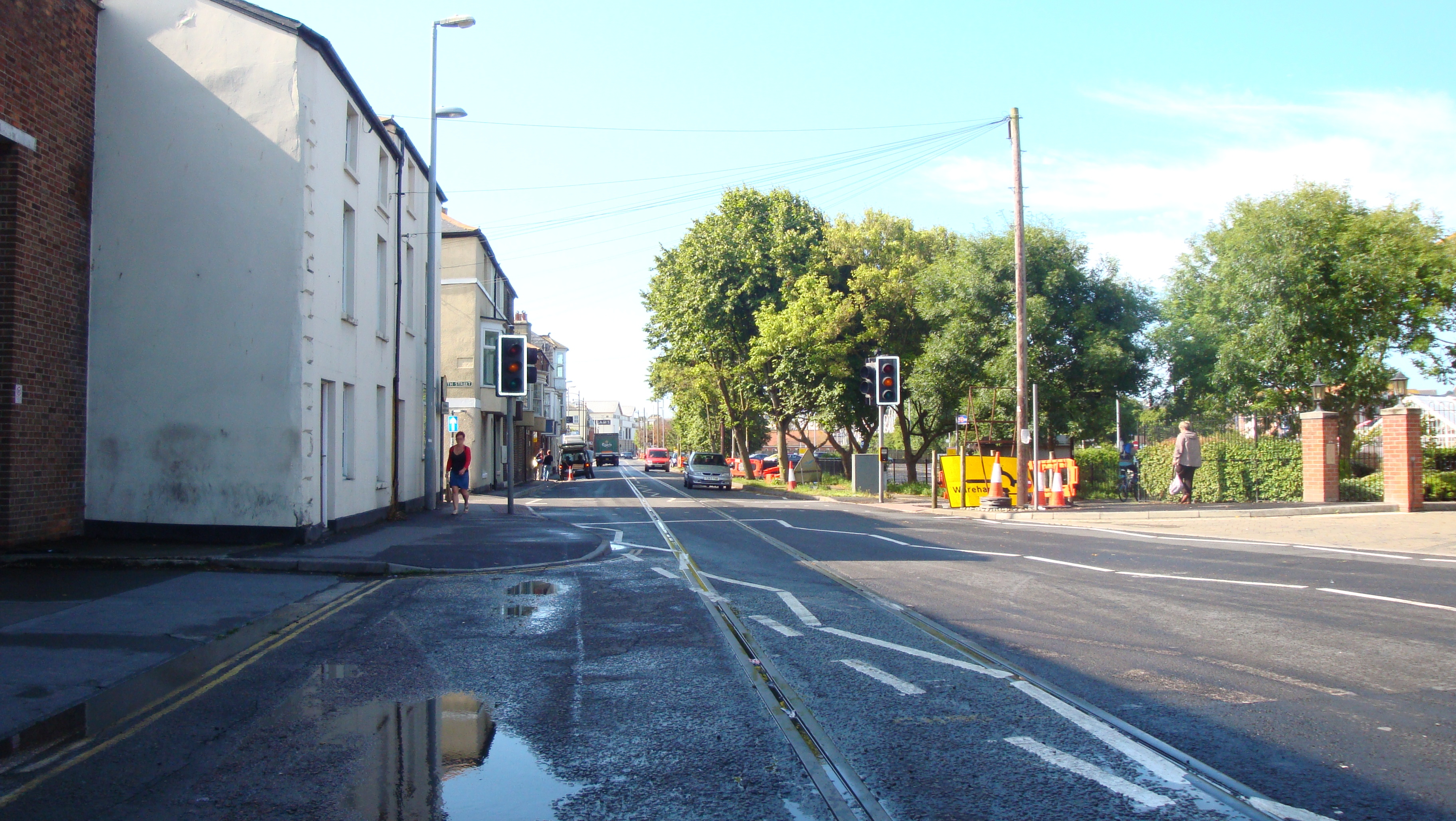
Commercial Road 2011, looking south

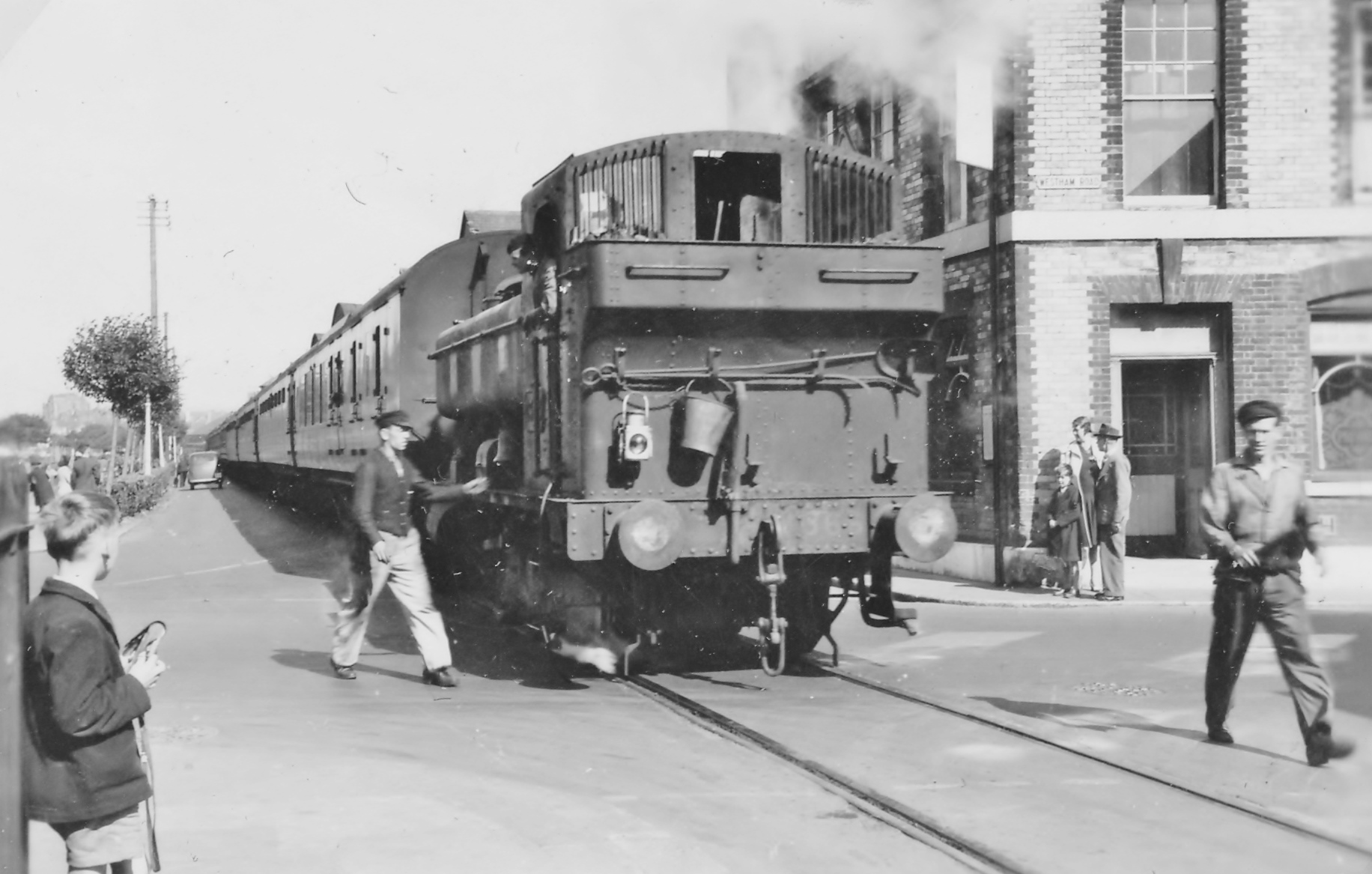
Commercial Road, c.1947

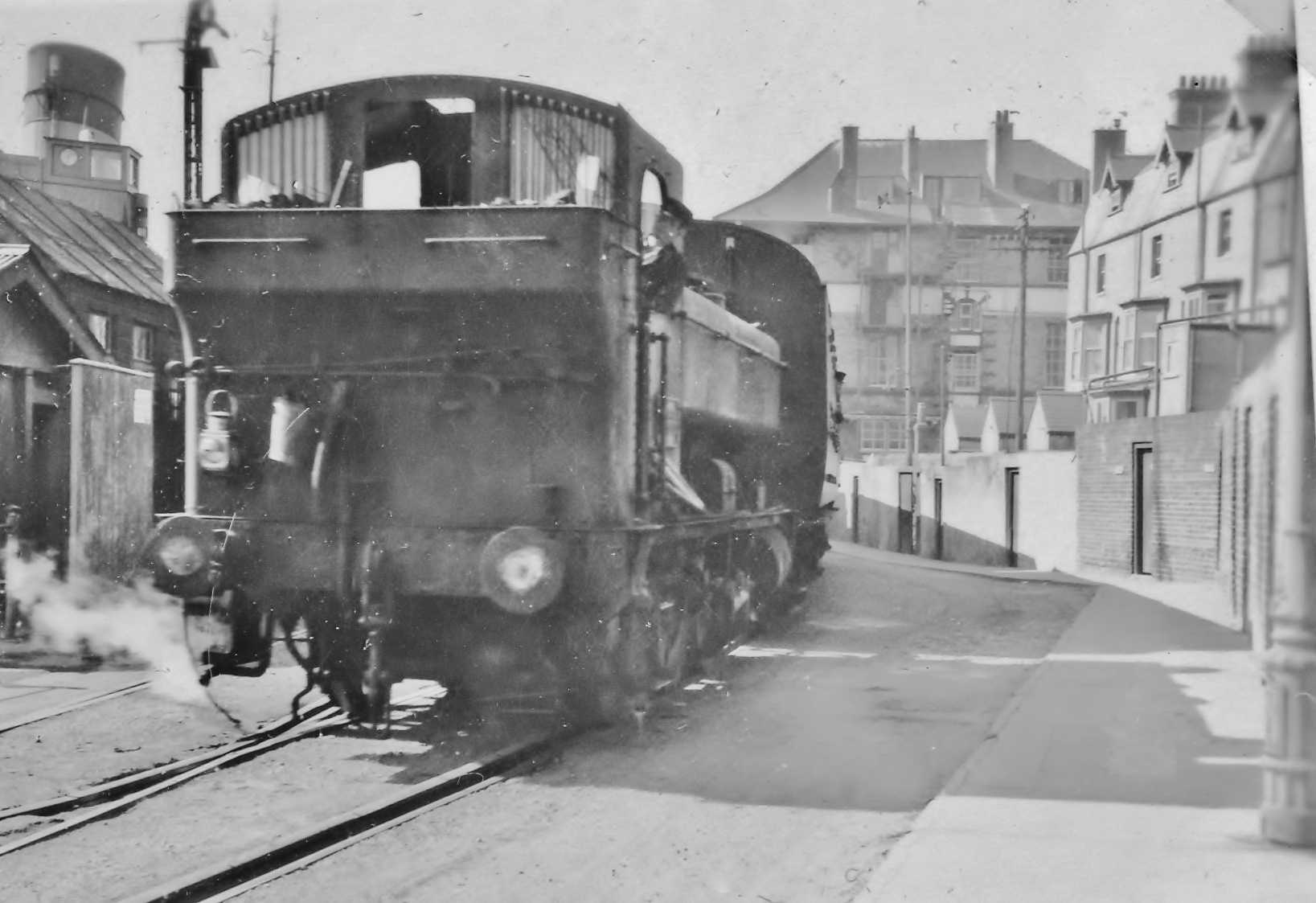
Custom House Quay, c.1947

== See also ==
- Zwickau Model

== Bibliography ==
- Lucking, J. H. (1986). The Weymouth Harbour Tramway, Poole: Oxford Publishing. ISBN 0-86093-304-0.
- Beale, G. (2001) The Weymouth Harbour Tramway, Wild Swan Publications. ISBN 1-874103-67-4.
