= Weymouth Quay railway station =

Disused railway station in Dorset, England

Coordinates: 50.60863°N 2.44828°W

Weymouth Quay
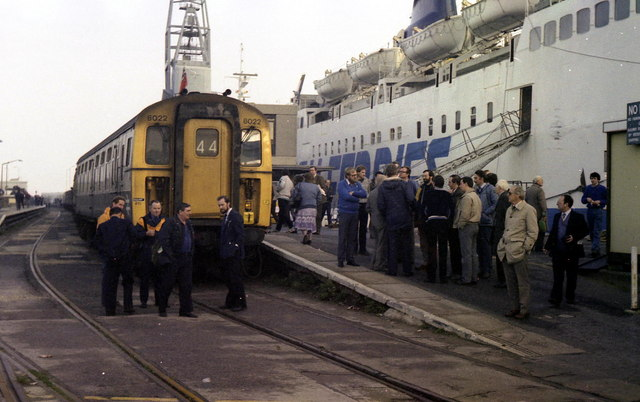
- Weymouth Quay railway station in 1986 (The station building is concealed by the train)

General information
- Location: Weymouth, Dorset; England
- Grid reference: SY683789

Other information
- Status: Disused

History
- Original company: Great Western Railway
- Pre-grouping: Great Western Railway
- Post-grouping: Great Western Railway

Key dates
- 1 July 1889: Opened
- 25 July 1940: Closed
- 15 June 1946: Reopened
- 26 February 1972: Goods facilities withdrawn
- 26 September 1987: End of regular scheduled passenger services
- 2 May 1999: Visit by one-off charter service
- 2017: Station formally closed by ORR
- 2021: Track lifted
Location

Weymouth Quay is a disused railway station in Weymouth, Dorset, England at the terminus of the Weymouth Harbour Tramway. Until September 1987 it was the regular terminus and starting point for boat trains to and from London Waterloo, linking to the ferry services with street running along the streets of the town.

After the regular boat trains were ended, the station was still occasionally used for special services, the last being a Pathfinder Tours charter on 2 May 1999. The track and station were no longer used at all after that, although they were still part of the rail network. The station buildings are now offices for Condor Ferries which operated a ferry service to the Channel Islands. However, with the purchase of its new ferry in 2015, Condor ceased to serve the port of Weymouth.

The line was designated "Out of Use (temporary)" for a period of two years by Network Rail on 15 January 2007, and again on 1 April 2009. Closure of the branch was proposed by Weymouth and Portland Borough Council, which was proposing to acquire the trackbed. In July 2014, it was reported that the sale of the line did not proceed and a campaign started to reopen the tram route claiming it would help with tourism and reduce car usage in the town. The Office of Rail and Road agreed to the permanent closure in 2017. In 2020 the local authority gained funding to pull up the line and the track was removed in 2020/21.

| Preceding station | Disused railways | Following station |
|---|---|---|
| Weymouth (Reversal needed) | Weymouth Harbour Tramway; Weymouth-Weymouth Quay | Terminus |
