= Let's Call It Quits =

Single by Slade

from the album Nobody's Fools
- B-side: "When the Chips Are Down"
- Released: 30 January 1976
- Genre: Glam rock, blues rock
- Length: 3:30
- Label: Polydor
- Songwriters: Noddy Holder, Jim Lea
- Producer: Chas Chandler

Slade singles chronology
"In For a Penny" (1975)	"Let's Call It Quits" (1976)	"Nobody's Fool" (1976)

Audio sample
- file; help

"Let's Call It Quits" is a song by the British rock band Slade, released on 30 January 1976 as the second single from their sixth studio album, Nobody's Fools. The song was written by lead vocalist Noddy Holder and bassist Jim Lea, and produced by Chas Chandler. It reached number 11 in the UK Singles Chart and remained in the top 50 for seven weeks.

== Background ==
By 1975, Slade began to feel stale, believing they had achieved as much success in the UK and Europe as they could. The band and their manager Chas Chandler decided that their next career move should be to try and crack America. The band agreed to move to there and build a reputation for their live performances from scratch, just as they had in the UK. In between touring, the band recorded their next album, Nobody's Fools, which saw the band move towards a more "American" soul/pop sound in attempt to gain a commercial break on the American charts. The lead single, "In for a Penny", was released in November 1975 and reached No. 11 in the UK, with "Let's Call It Quits" following in January 1976 as the second single. Like its predecessor, it too reached No. 11. It would be Slade's last Top 20 single in the UK for five years.

Upon release, the band suffered legal issues over "Let's Call It Quits" as the American musician Allen Toussaint felt the song was similar to his 1973 track "Brickyard Blues". Although Lea maintained that he had never heard the song, the band settled out of court and agreed to give Toussaint half of the song's royalties. In a 1986 fan club interview, Lea recalled: "We had a court case taken against us once for "Let's Call It Quits" because it sounded like a song called "Brickyard Blues", a song that I had never heard before or since."

== Release ==
"Let's Call It Quits" was released on 7" vinyl by Polydor Records in the UK, Ireland, across Europe, Scandinavia, Yugoslavia and Japan. The B-side, "When the Chips Are Down", was exclusive to the single and would later appear on the band's 2007 compilation B-Sides.

== Promotion ==
A music video was filmed to promote the single, which featured the band performing the song in a room with a black and white chequered floor and surrounded with large mirrors. In the UK, the band performed the song on the TV shows Supersonic and Jim'll Fix It.

== Critical reception ==
Upon its release, Ray Fox-Cumming of Record Mirror & Disc praised "Let's Call It Quits" as "one of Slade's best". He described it as a "slow, heavy rocker", with "rude words", "some deliciously lascivious guitar" and "beautiful" production by Chas Chandler. Caroline Coon of Melody Maker felt the "laidback, slow-rocking number" was "much weaker" than the band's previous work, although it showed Holder in "marvelous, raucous form". Sounds said it was Slade's "best record in ages, with Noddy bellowing tender words of love as only he can". Kate Phillips of the NME noted the "deliberate sloppiness", "messy guitar solo" and Holder's "turbulent, dark, excitingly powerful" vocals. Alex Gordon of the Harborough Mail commented, "This is Slade as most of their fans like 'em. Raw, rough and tough. The stabbing beat fairly bites into you and Noddy Holder's vocal is a savage delight." He also felt that, after the band's recent run of "melodic singles", "Let's Call It Quits" would be the single to "re-establish them as one of the most forceful names in British rock". In a retrospective review of Nobody's Fools, Geoff Ginsberg of AllMusic described the song as a "real screamer where Noddy Holder coughs up a great vocal".

== Track listing ==
7-inch single

1. "Let's Call It Quits" - 3:30
2. "When the Chips are Down" - 4:16

== Personnel ==
Slade

- Noddy Holder - lead vocals, guitar
- Dave Hill - lead guitar, backing vocals
- Jim Lea - bass, backing vocals
- Don Powell - drums

Production

- Chas Chandler - producer

== Charts ==
Chart (1976)	Peak position
UK Singles Chart	11
