= Nobody's Fools =

Studio album by Slade
- Released: 5 March 1976
- Recorded: Mid-1975; The Record Plant, New York
- Genre: Glam rock
- Length: 42:03
- Labels: Polydor (UK), Warner Bros. (US)
- Producer: Chas Chandler

Slade chronology
Slade in Flame (1974)	Nobody's Fools (1976)	Whatever Happened to Slade (1977)

Singles from Nobody's Fools
- 1. "In For a Penny" Released: 14 November 1975; 2. "Let's Call It Quits" Released: 30 January 1976; 3. "Nobody's Fool" Released: 9 April 1976

Nobody's Fools is the sixth studio album by the British rock group Slade. It was released in March 1976 and reached No. 14 in the UK. The album was produced by Chas Chandler.

Musically, the album showed the band dropping their "loud" and "rocky" type songs, as they moved towards a more "American" soul/pop sound. Tasha Thomas was also hired to provide backing vocals—the first Slade album to feature female backing. British fans accused the band of selling out and forgetting about their fan base in the UK, as the band had been in the U.S. for most of 1975, trying to crack the market. The album was Slade's first (since their rise to fame) not to reach the UK Top 10, and to drop out of the chart after a chart run of only four weeks. It would be their last album to make a UK chart appearance until the 1980 compilation Slade Smashes!.

== Background ==
"We're really proud of the album. We think it's our best, but we always say that every time we bring another one out. However, there is something special about this one."

— Noddy Holder discussing the album in 1976.

Since their rise to fame in 1971, Slade had failed to achieve a major breakthrough in the United States. During the period of 1972–73, the band began touring there as a step towards trying to crack the market. A number of American cities took positively to Slade, including St Louis, Philadelphia and New York City. However, in other areas, the band's anthemic, audience participation-dominated act was less enthusiastically received. By 1975, the band began feeling stale and felt they had achieved as much success in the UK and Europe that they could. Slade and their manager Chas Chandler decided that the next best career move was to try to crack America. The band agreed to move to there and build a reputation for their live performances from scratch, just as they had in the UK. Holder said in 1975: "During the past five years when the band peaked, we did five major tours of Britain, six tours of Europe, two tours of Australia, two of Japan, visited the USA a few times, made a film... you can understand why we felt more than a little jaded. We reckoned that we needed to undertake a fresh challenge to regain that old spark."

In Spring 1975, Slade relocated to New York City and throughout the year, the band toured constantly, often on packages with the likes of Aerosmith, ZZ Top and Black Sabbath. Often second on the bill, Slade honed their live show, taking the idea of playing skilfully seriously which went down consistently well with the American audience. While the success wasn't translated into US airplay, the band felt improved and rejuvenated. In between tours, Holder and Lea got down to what Holder called some "serious writing". In mid-1975, the band booked themselves into New York's Record Plant and recorded the album Nobody's Fools. Speaking in a 1976 fan club interview, Holder said of recording an album in America: "The album is why we went to the States, not for tax reasons, folks! We wanted to get fresh ideas, we felt we were getting a bit stale living in England." For the album, songwriters Holder and Lea drew much inspiration from living in New York City.

The album's lead single, "In for a Penny", was released in November 1975 and reached No. 11 in the UK. The second single, "Let's Call It Quits" also peaked at No. 11 after its release in January 1976. The album was released in March and reached No. 14. A third and final single, "Nobody's Fool", broke Slade's run of 17 consecutive hit singles in April, reaching only No. 53. In America, "Nobody's Fool" was the only single to be released from the album, however the neither the album or single made any chart impact. Reflecting on the album in an early 1986 fan club interview, Hill said: "Nobody's Fools was a bit different, wasn't it? That was recorded in America, but it didn't happen over there."

The album has been noted for still standing up today as a "varied and highly entertaining listen" and the band themselves remain proud of the album. Both drummer Don Powell and Holder rate it as their favourite Slade long player. In a 1987 interview, Holder said: "That is the only one I can really sit down at home and listen to from start to finish." In a 1976 interview, Lea said: "I am really proud of the album and believe it is the best album we have ever done. I have no especial favourite track on the album – I love them all. I'm sure you will see quite an American influence on a lot of the tracks and we believe the hard work we put in, in America had paid dividends."

== Recording ==
In a 1976 fan club interview, Holder spoke of the album's recording: "We recorded the album in New York, where we spent something like six weeks on it. We did it all in one go, more or less, well we also did a couple of days in a L.A. studio a couple of months before, just to get into the swing of things." To allow the band to create what Holder described as a "really first class album", the band decided to take some time off from touring: "We decided not to rush the album, like we have done on past recording sessions. We wanted to get everything just so. It wasn't just a 'wam bam' job. We had six weeks in the studio to get better and better, so the playing got better, and the sound got better, so yeah in terms of improvement it's a big step ahead. The sound and production is the best yet."

Speaking of the musical influences on the album, Holder revealed:

"Ya know we've been influenced by a lotta things, particularly soul. We used some coloured chicks for back-up vocals and I really enjoyed working with them, it was something different for us, and at the same time it gave our sound a lot of body! Those girls have great voices. We enjoyed doing all sorts of sounds, like country, funk, rock. I mean every track has its own particular style."

Lea also revealed in a 1976 fan club interview: "We just got a terrific buzz when we were working on the album. We were more relaxed than we've ever been, more willing and able to be more experimental in the studios, and we took it easy and relaxed. Certainly we felt we had a good product in the making, so it seemed right to put everything we had into it."

=== Title ===
The band decided to name the album after the title track, "Nobody's Fool". The band were originally unsure of what to call the album, but when listening to the title track one day, they decided to add an 's' to 'Fool'.

== Music ==
"In For a Penny"
The album's lead single, "In for a Penny" is a ballad and the only Slade song to feature an accordion.

"Let's Call It Quits"
Slade's last top 20 hit in the UK until 1981, "Let's Call It Quits" was described as having a "slinky rock groove".

"Nobody's Fool"
Slade's first single not to chart in the UK Top 50 since their rise to fame in the early 1970s, "Nobody's Fool" features Tasha Thomas on backing vocals.

As a result of their experiences in the United States, Nobody's Fools presents a different musical direction. Described as having a "California" sound by AllMusic, a genre popular at the time from bands such as The Eagles, the album explores various different genres. AllMusic said that "many of the numbers on this record are loaded with Dobros, mandos, and female background vocals." The song features a strong influence from soul music, most prominently on the songs featuring female backing vocals.

=== Side one ===
Lea originally envisaged "Nobody's Fool" to be a "twenty-minute extravaganza". However, the band later agreed to cut down the song to a more standard duration as it was felt that it would not appeal to the band's fanbase. A music video for the song was filmed at St. Johns Wood Studios in London. "Do The Dirty" is described by AllMusic as a "foot-stomping rocker with a little funkiness thrown in for good measure." The song opens with the shout of the word "boogie", which was provided by one of the band's American roadies. The band held an audition to see who could shout it the best.

"Let's Call It Quits" has been described as having a "bluesy pay-off" and "slinky rock groove" by Chris Ingham in the liner notes of the 2007 remaster of the album. After it became a UK hit, the band had a court case taken against them by Allen Toussaint, who felt the song was similar to his "Play Something Sweet (Brickyard Blues)". The case was settled out of court with the band giving them 50% in songwriting royalties, though Lea maintained their song was one he had "never heard before or since". "Pack Up Your Troubles" is an acoustic-based country number with a "camp-fire feel". The song features Paul Prestotino on Dobro guitar. "In For a Penny" is the only Slade track to feature accordion and has the longest Dave Hill guitar solo used on a Slade single.

=== Side two ===
"Get on Up" is one of the more rock-based tracks on the album. It became part of Slade's live set, with a live recording appearing on their 1978 live album Slade Alive, Vol. 2. The lyrics of "L.A. Jinx" refer to the bad luck the band seemed to suffer whenever they played in Los Angeles. Holder said in a 1976 fan club interview: "Something always goes wrong; the gear blows up, we all get electric shocks, and, oh there's always some sort of equipment fault – we're always jinxed!" "Did Ya Mama Ever Tell Ya" was described by Holder as "not exactly roots reggae, more Wolverhampton stuff!" and cited it as his favourite track from the album around the time of its release.

"Scratch My Back" is another rock track in similar form to "Get on Up". AllMusic described the song as "pure Slade, even with the out of place arrangement." "I'm a Talker" is a folk-based track, described by Ingham as an "infectious folksy drinking song". "All the World Is a Stage" features the prominent use of keyboards and closes with sound effects of high pitched laughing.

== Critical reception ==
Professional ratings
Review scores
Source	Rating
AllMusic	1.5/5 stars
Classic Rock	positive
Record Collector	4/5 stars

Upon its release, Music Week described Nobody's Fools as a "cracking album", showing Slade having "matured" and "playing better than ever". Sue Byrom of Record Mirror & Disc noted the album "offer[s] a lot of variety", with "lots of pace", the use of female backing vocals, and "solid bass work that would have done justice to Led Zeppelin". She concluded, "It's not an album of singles – it does present tracks that are a lot deeper than I expected. You're right lads, you're nobody's fools!" Tony Stewart of the NME considered it to be Slade's "serious crack at the album market", but he felt that it failed to deliver. He noted that, although "superficially the music is of a reasonable standard", "there's not a lot of depth", with most of the lyrics "banal and drab" and "even the way they play the material could do with a bit of beefing up". He concluded, "Really the album is just a collection of hooky little singles and passable B sides. To be seriously considered as album artistes they've certainly got to come up with something more substiantial than this."

In the US, Cash Box noted that the band adopted a "laid back stance" on the album, with "rock still around in abundance but, equally present, are pop subtleties and a couple of genuine mellow moments". Geoff Ginsberg of AllMusic retrospectively noted: "Nobody's Fools has some really great songs on it, but all things considered it was the band's worst album at that point. Basically misguided from the get-go, Nobody's Fools is constantly trying to free itself from the oppressive production and arrangements." In 2010, Classic Rock considered the album "worth exploring", describing it as "surprisingly slick-sounding". Colin Harper of Record Collector concluded the album was "engagingly eclectic, if not quite truly classic."

== Track listing ==
All tracks are written by Noddy Holder and Jim Lea.

Side one
No.	Title	Length
1.	"Nobody's Fool"	4:40
2.	"Do the Dirty"	4:42
3.	"Let's Call It Quits"	3:30
4.	"Pack Up Your Troubles"	3:25
5.	"In for a Penny"	3:35

Side two
No.	Title	Length
6.	"Get on Up"	3:26
7.	"L.A. Jinx"	3:58
8.	"Did Ya Mama Ever Tell Ya"	3:06
9.	"Scratch My Back"	3:06
10.	"I'm a Talker"	3:18
11.	"All the World Is a Stage"	3:57

2007 Salvo remaster bonus tracks
No.	Title	Length
12.	"Thanks for the Memory" (1975 non-album single)	4:34
13.	"Raining in My Champagne" (B-side of "Thanks for the Memory")	4:12
14.	"Can You Just Imagine" (B-side of "In For a Penny")	3:32
15.	"When the Chips are Down" (B-side of "Let's Call It Quits")	4:15

== Personnel ==
Slade

- Noddy Holder – lead vocals, rhythm guitar
- Dave Hill – lead guitar, backing vocals
- Jim Lea – bass, backing vocals
- Don Powell – drums

Additional personnel

- Chas Chandler – producer
- Tasha Thomas – backing vocals
- Paul Prestotino – dobro guitar
- Corky Stasiak, Denis Ferranti, Gabby Gabriel, Gess Young – engineers
- Ian A. Walker – art direction
- Gered Mankowitz – photography

== Charts ==
Chart performance for Nobody's Fools
Chart (1976)	Peak position
Swedish Albums (Sverigetopplistan)	14
UK Albums (Official Charts)	14
US Record World 151–200 Album Chart	178

Chart (2023)	Peak position
Scottish Albums (Official Charts)	33
UK Independent Albums (Official Charts)	16
UK Rock & Metal Albums (Official Charts)	9
