= Thanks for the Memory (Wham Bam Thank You Mam) =

Single by Slade
- B-side: "Raining in My Champagne"
- Released: 9 May 1975
- Genre: Rock
- Length: 4:33
- Label: Polydor
- Songwriters: Noddy Holder, Jim Lea
- Producer: Chas Chandler

Slade singles chronology
| "How Does It Feel" (1975) | "Thanks for the Memory (Wham Bam Thank You Mam)" (1975) | "In for a Penny" (1975) |

Audio sample
- file; help

"Thanks for the Memory (Wham Bam Thank You Mam)" is a song by the English rock band Slade, released by Polydor Records on 9 May 1975 as a non-album single. It was written by lead vocalist Noddy Holder and bassist Jim Lea, and produced by Chas Chandler. It reached No. 7 in the UK, remaining in the charts for seven weeks.

== Background ==
"Thanks for the Memory (Wham Bam Thank You Mam)" was Slade's first new single following their film Slade in Flame. Although it later received recognition as one of the greatest rock films of all time, the initial reception towards the film was less positive, particularly from fans who did not expect the film to have such a bleak and sour atmosphere. Following the single release of the film's theme tune, "How Does It Feel", "Thanks for the Memory" was released in May 1975. It reached No. 7 and would be the band's last Top 10 single until 1981's "We'll Bring the House Down". In the first two weeks of release, the single sold 200,000 copies.

"Thanks for the Memory" is notable for its prominent use of keyboard, which, at the time, was new to a Slade single. The part was played on the recording by Lea, after an audition failed to find a session keyboardist who could play the part as the band wanted. In a 1976 interview with Capital Radio, Holder cited the song as one of his favourites. Shortly after its release, Led Zeppelin drummer John Bonham told Lea he liked the song and would loved to have played on it.

== Release ==
"Thanks for the Memory" was released on 7" vinyl by Polydor Records in the UK, Ireland, across Europe, Scandinavia, Yugoslavia, South Africa, Australia, New Zealand and Japan. The B-side, "Raining in My Champagne", was exclusive to the single and would later appear on the band's 2007 compilation B-Sides. Although the song was a non-album single elsewhere, it was included on the United States Warner Bros. Records release of Slade in Flame in 1975. In 1975, a 7" flexi-disc was released in the UK by Smiths Crisps as part of their "Chart Busters" series. "Far Far Away" was the A-side, with "Thanks for the Memory (Wham Bam Thank You Mam)" as the B-side.

== Promotion ==
A music video was filmed to promote the single, which was directed by either Gavrik Lasey or Richard Loncraine. The video featured the band performing the song with Holder wearing a red and yellow-spotted jacket and large kipper tie, with guitarist Dave Hill in black studded cowboy-type gear. In the UK, the band performed the song on the music show Top of the Pops and the children's show Shang-a-Lang.

== Critical reception ==
Upon its release, Sue Byrom of Record Mirror described "Thanks for the Memory" as a "very fast, driving single" and added, "The reaction from fans on their current tour seems to be as strong as ever, but that same reaction doesn't seem to have been as evident in their recent chart placings. This is such a different sound it's difficult to gauge just what it'll do, but I don't think it's going to be one of their biggest hits." John Hutson of the Thanet Times noted that Slade had returned with a "stomper" after "several slow and relatively unsuccessful singles" and continued, "It differs from their earlier style as it depends more on electric organ than guitars. The chorus is fairly memorable and Noddy Holder works hard at the vocals. The best thing from the group this year." Aberdeen Evening Express praised the "rumbustious, raucous rocker" as being "probably Slade's best single yet" and "inevitably, a major hit". The Greenford & Northolt Gazette noted that, despite the "jumpy rhythm", the song is "still more restrained than all the old fiery Slade hits" and, "like their last single, it grows on you with every play".

== Track listing ==
7-inch single

1. "Thanks for the Memory (Wham Bam Thank You Mam)" – 4:30
2. "Raining In My Champagne" – 4:12

== Personnel ==
Slade

- Noddy Holder – lead vocals, guitar
- Dave Hill – lead guitar, backing vocals
- Jim Lea – keyboard, bass, backing vocals
- Don Powell – drums

Production

- Chas Chandler – producer

== Charts ==
Chart performance for "Thanks for the Memory (Wham Bam Thank You Mam)"
| Chart (1975) | Peak position |
|---|---|
| Austria (Ö3 Austria Top 40) | 12 |
| Belgium (Ultratop 50 Wallonia) | 36 |
| Finland (Suomen virallinen lista) | 15 |
| Ireland (IRMA) | 3 |
| Netherlands (Dutch Top 40) | 24 |
| Netherlands (Single Top 100) | 16 |
| Norway (VG-lista) | 5 |
| UK Singles (Official Charts) | 7 |
| West Germany (GfK) | 13 |
