= Crackers (album) =

Studio album by Slade
- Released: 18 November 1985
- Recorded: 1985
- Genres: Hard rock; Christmas music
- Length: 46:52
- Label: Telstar
- Producers: Jim Lea; John Punter (tracks 6, 9, 12-13)

Slade chronology
Rogues Gallery (1985)	Crackers (1985)	You Boyz Make Big Noize (1987)

Crackers is a studio/compilation album by the British rock band Slade. It was released on 18 November 1985 and reached No. 34 in the UK charts. It was certified Gold by the BPI that same month. The album was produced by bassist Jim Lea except for "All Join Hands", "Do You Believe in Miracles", "My Oh My" and "Run Runaway", which were all produced by John Punter. The album contained a mix of the band's previous hits, some re-recorded songs and a selection of covers.

On Crackers, Slade tried to create an LP that had a party atmosphere to it. Since its original release, the album has had numerous re-issues over the years with somewhat different titles and various additional phrases on the cover art, including having "The Christmas Party Album" on the cover art of an older version, using the titles Slade's Crazee Christmas! (1999) and The Party Album (2001), and adding the phrase "The Rockin' Party Album!" (2006). There has also been some variation in the tracks on the album in re-releases.

== Background ==
Following the release of the band's 1985 studio album Rogues Gallery, the band were approached by Telstar to create a Christmas-related party album. The album included cover versions of "Let's Dance", "Santa Claus Is Coming to Town", "Hi Ho Silver Lining", "Let's Have a Party!", "Do They Know It's Christmas?" and "Auld Lang Syne/You'll Never Walk Alone". The band re-recorded their own past hits "Cum on Feel the Noize" and "Get Down and Get with It". The remaining eight tracks were previously recorded songs from the band's catalogue, including the new single "Do You Believe in Miracles". The album was a success in the UK, where it reached No. 34 and was certified Gold. The later 1999 release Slade's Crazee Christmas would chart several times on the UK Budget Albums Chart between 2001-05.

Speaking to Kerrang! in 1985, Noddy Holder said of Crackers, "This LP features 16 tracks, eight of our own in re-worked form plus eight covers. Telstar, which is distributed through RCA, approached us with the idea and we sat down to democratically decide what to put on it. It was fun doing the project and I hope it's fun to listen to."

Although Slade's label RCA released "Do You Believe in Miracles" as a single, a deal was struck with Telstar to include the song on Crackers. After the single peaked at No. 54 in the UK, it was suggested that its inclusion on the album had caused it to fail to reach a higher charting. In a 1986 interview, drummer Don Powell said: "That could be a reason. Funnily enough, that was one of the bones of contention - Telstar said that they wanted it on the album, whereas we didn't because that would mean that it would split the sales between the single and the album. I know that if I personally like someone's single, and it's going to be on their latest album, then I'll wait and buy the album."

== Recording ==
Speaking of recording the album in a 1986 interview, guitarist Dave Hill said: "I enjoyed making the tracks for Crackers a lot more than those for Rogues Gallery." In his interview that year, Powell revealed his thoughts on the Crackers project: "Well, we were a bit dubious at first, we thought that it might have been another Black Lace type of thing. When we actually recorded the cover versions though, we had a great time doing them. We just went into the studio and put them down one after the other - it was like playing live on stage."

While recording Crackers, Hill discovered Victor Herman, a busker, who was playing bagpipes in Oxford Street, London. As the band were due to record their own version of "Auld Lang Syne", Hill invited Herman to add an authentic touch to the recording. Herman agreed, and when he'd finished recording his part, Slade gave him an envelope with a sizeable sum of money in it, along with their thanks and best wishes. Two days later, the envelope was returned by post, along with a letter from Herman, saying that he'd enjoyed himself so much in the studio that he didn't want the money. Slade later invited him to their Christmas party on 18 November 1985 – the release day of the album. At the party, Slade presented Herman with one of the band's Gold Discs as a keepsake.

== Track listing ==
=== Crackers: The Christmas Party Album (1985) ===
No.	Title	Writer(s)	Length
1.	"Let's Dance"	Jim Lee	2:36
2.	"Santa Claus Is Coming to Town"	John Frederick Coots, Haven Gillespie	2:39
3.	"Hi Ho Silver Lining"	Larry Weiss, Scott English	3:24
4.	"We'll Bring the House Down"	Noddy Holder, Jim Lea	3:34
5.	"Cum On Feel the Noize"	Holder, Lea	2:57
6.	"All Join Hands"	Holder, Lea	4:16
7.	"Okey Cokey"	Jimmy Kennedy	3:25
8.	"Merry Xmas Everybody"	Holder, Lea	3:57
9.	"Do You Believe in Miracles"	Holder, Lea	4:12
10.	"Let's Have a Party"	Cliff Friend, Joe Haynes, Phil Baxter	1:47
11.	"Get Down and Get with It"	Bobby Marchan	3:28
12.	"My Oh My"	Holder, Lea	4:10
13.	"Run Runaway"	Holder, Lea	3:43
14.	"Here's To... (The New Year)"	Holder, Lea	3:10
15.	"Do They Know It's Christmas (Feed The World)"	Bob Geldof, Midge Ure	3:38
16.	"Auld Lang Syne/You'll Never Walk Alone"	Rodgers and Hammerstein, Traditional	3:28

=== Crackers: The Rockin' Party Album! (2006) ===
No.	Title	Length
1.	"Let's Dance"	2:36
2.	"Santa Claus Is Coming to Town"	2:39
3.	"Hi Ho Silver Lining"	3:24
4.	"Cum On Feel the Noize"	2:57
5.	"Okey Cokey"	3:25
6.	"Merry Xmas Everybody"	3:57
7.	"Let's Have a Party"	1:47
8.	"Get Down and Get With It"	3:28
9.	"Here's To... (The New Year)"	3:10
10.	"Do They Know It's Christmas (Feed The World)"	3:38
11.	"Auld Lang Syne/You'll Never Walk Alone"	3:28

=== Crackers: The Christmas Party Album (1993) ===
No.	Title	Length
1.	"Merry Xmas Everybody"	3:57
2.	"Let's Dance"	2:36
3.	"Santa Claus Is Coming to Town"	2:39
4.	"Hi Ho Silver Lining"	3:24
5.	"We'll Bring the House Down"	3:34
6.	"Cum On Feel the Noize (Crackers Version)"	2:57
7.	"All Join Hands"	4:16
8.	"Okey Cokey"	3:25
9.	"Do You Believe in Miracles"	4:12
10.	"Let's Have a Party"	1:47
11.	"Get Down and Get With It (Crackers Version)"	3:28
12.	"My Oh My"	4:10
13.	"Run Runaway"	3:43
14.	"Here's To... (The New Year)"	3:10
15.	"Do They Know It's Christmas (Feed The World)"	3:38
16.	"Auld Lang Syne/You'll Never Walk Alone"	3:28

== Critical reception ==
Professional ratings
Review scores
Source	Rating
AllMusic	2.5/5 stars
Kerrang!	4.5/5 stars

Upon its release, Malcolm Dome of Kerrang! called Crackers the "party album of the year", on which Slade "repackage some of their classics together with their own inimitable renderings of such tomes as 'Santa Claus Is Coming to Town', 'Okey Cokey' and 'Auld Lang Syne'/'You'll Never Walk Alone'." The Aberdeen Evening Express described it as a "raucous party LP" which "reviv[es] memories of Slade's heyday with also a sprinkling of seasonal favourites".

Dave Thompson of AllMusic retrospectively described the album as "simultaneously the most joyously raucous, loud and singalong album in the entire Slade catalog, and the single most detestable record they ever made". He added that the album is "so buoyant and boisterous that even hermits could play it and believe they're having fun", but questioned whether it could be considered "a proper Slade album". In 2010, Classic Rock felt the album should be "avoided", stating, "This turkey was very much a nadir for Slade. The combination of re-recorded hits and festive fare achieved its commercial goal, but the album's very existence slammed the credibility of HMS Slade amidships like some unforgiving German torpedo."

== Personnel ==
Slade

- Noddy Holder – lead vocals, rhythm guitar
- Dave Hill – lead guitar, backing vocals
- Jim Lea – bass, keyboards, backing vocals, producer
- Don Powell – drums

Additional credits

- John Punter – producer (tracks 6, 9, 12–13)
- Victor Herman – bagpipes on "Auld Lang Syne" (uncredited)
- Dave Garland – engineer

== Charts ==
=== Original release ===
Chart (1985)	Peak position
UK Albums (Official Charts)	34

=== Reissue "Slade's Crazee Christmas" ===
Chart (2001)	Peak position
UK Budget Albums Chart	31

Chart (2002)	Peak position
UK Budget Albums Chart	23

Chart (2003)	Peak position
UK Budget Albums Chart	21

Chart (2005)	Peak position
UK Budget Albums Chart	37

=== Reissue "Crackers: The Christmas Party Album" ===
Chart (2022)	Peak position
Official Albums Sales Chart	92

Chart (2022)	Peak position
Official Physical Albums Chart	85

Chart (2022)	Peak position
Official Independent Albums Chart	39

== Certifications ==
Region	Certification	Certified units/sales
United Kingdom (BPI)	Gold	100,000^{^}
^{^} Shipments figures based on certification alone.
