= Nobody's Fool (Slade song) =

Single by Slade

from the album Nobody's Fools
- B-side: "L. A. Jinx"
- Released: 9 April 1976
- Genre: Rock
- Length: 4:40 (album version); 3:50 (single version); 3:15 (US edit)
- Label: Polydor
- Songwriters: Noddy Holder; Jim Lea
- Producer: Chas Chandler

Slade singles chronology
"Let's Call It Quits" (1976)	"Nobody's Fool" (1976)	"Gypsy Roadhog" (1977)

Audio sample
- file; help

"Nobody's Fool" is a song by English rock band Slade, released on 9 April 1976 as the third and final single from their sixth studio album, Nobody's Fools. It was written by lead vocalist Noddy Holder and bassist Jim Lea, and was produced by Chas Chandler. "Nobody's Fool" failed to enter the UK Singles Chart, ending a run of 17 consecutive hits the band had achieved since 1971, but it did reach number 3 in the UK Star Breakers Chart.

== Background ==
In 1975, after enjoying four years of success across much of the world, Slade relocated to the United States in attempt to break the market there. The resultant album Nobody's Fools was tailored towards the US market but failed to give the band their commercial break. The album fared better in the UK and Europe but still saw a considerable slump in sales when compared to the band's previous releases. In the US, "Nobody's Fool" was released by Warner Bros. as the album's only single, whereas in the UK and Europe it was issued by Polydor as the third and final single. Breaking the band's run of 17 consecutive hits, it failed to enter the UK Singles Chart, although it did reach number 3 in the UK Star Breakers Chart on 24 April 1976.

Inspired by the music of Queen, Jim Lea originally intended for "Nobody's Fool" to be a "twenty-minute extravaganza, with everything thrown in". When the band came to record the song, they decided to scrap the idea as it was felt it would not appeal to the band's fan base. The song was subsequently recorded in a more standard format and features Tasha Thomas on backing vocals.

== Music video ==
The song's music video was directed by Bruce Gowers for the production company Trilion Video and was shot at St John's Wood Studios in London. At the time of the single's release, the video was only shown once on UK television on Sally James' LWT show Saturday Scene.

== Critical reception ==
Upon its release as a single in the UK, Sue Byrom of Record Mirror & Disc described "Nobody's Fool" as "Slade at their best" and believed it would be an "instant hit". She called it "one of the best singles Slade have released for ages", noting it is "bright and bouncy" and "very catchy, from the first hearing". The Shepherds Bush Gazette praised Slade for "really hav[ing] come up with a winner this time". They wrote, "They have managed to combine the mellow sound only achieved before on their slower numbers with a bounchy, up-tempo rhythm. Gone is the screech and the crash-bang-wallop. Welcome instead an irresistible toe-tapper with a tune that will have you singing along by the second chorus."

John Hutson of the Thanet Times was also positive, remarking, "Enter Slade with style and a newly-found sophistication which epitomises their latest album – of which this is the title track. The song is nicely controlled with lush piano and guitar chords to enfold Noddy Holder's vocals and gets well away from the group's former brash and raw image." Ken Lawrence of the Sandwell Evening Mail considered it a "good song" and noted the "change of style from foot-stomp music to a less violent, easier-to-listen to brand". Chris Mosey of the Dorset Evening Echo was less positive in his review, remarking, "One day soon they are going to put out a single that doesn't make the charts. This could be it." Steve Clarke of the NME felt the song was not "very inspired" and was "lyrically lame all the way". He concluded, "Certainly they aren't doing themselves justice bringing out inferior product like this."

In a review of the single's US release, Record World wrote, "Slade's new streamlined sound displays less of the throaty coarseness of old and more of a melodic pop timbre. This tune has excellent AM/FM potential as a couple of chiming guitars dominate." Jim Green of Trouser Press called it "arguably the best track" from Nobody's Fools and "certainly the most commercial". He remarked it "barely sound[s] like Slade but for Noddy's unmistakable vocal, and even he sounds different until he hits the chorus", and also noted the "slightly syncopated, catchy bass line" and "Motown-ish female backing vocals".

== Formats ==
7-inch single (UK, Germany, Austria, Belgium and Yugoslavia)

1. "Nobody's Fool" – 3:50
2. "L.A. Jinx" – 3:57

7-inch single (US and Canada)

1. "Nobody's Fool" (Edit) – 3:15
2. "When the Chips are Down" – 4:16

== Personnel ==
Slade

- Noddy Holder – lead vocals, guitar
- Dave Hill – lead guitar, backing vocals
- Jim Lea – bass, piano, backing vocals
- Don Powell – drums

Additional musicians

- Tasha Thomas – backing vocals

Production

- Chas Chandler – production

== Charts ==
Chart (1976)	Peak position
Irish Singles Chart	21
UK Star Breakers Chart	3

== Cover versions ==
In 1980, Lea recorded a version of "Nobody's Fool" as part of his side project, The Dummies, with his brother Frank. It was intended for it to be released as a single that year but the plans were dropped after the Dummies recorded further material. The Dummies' version of "Nobody's Fool" would remain unreleased until its appearance on the album A Day in the Life of the Dummies in 1992.
