= Tasha Thomas =

American singer (1945–1984)

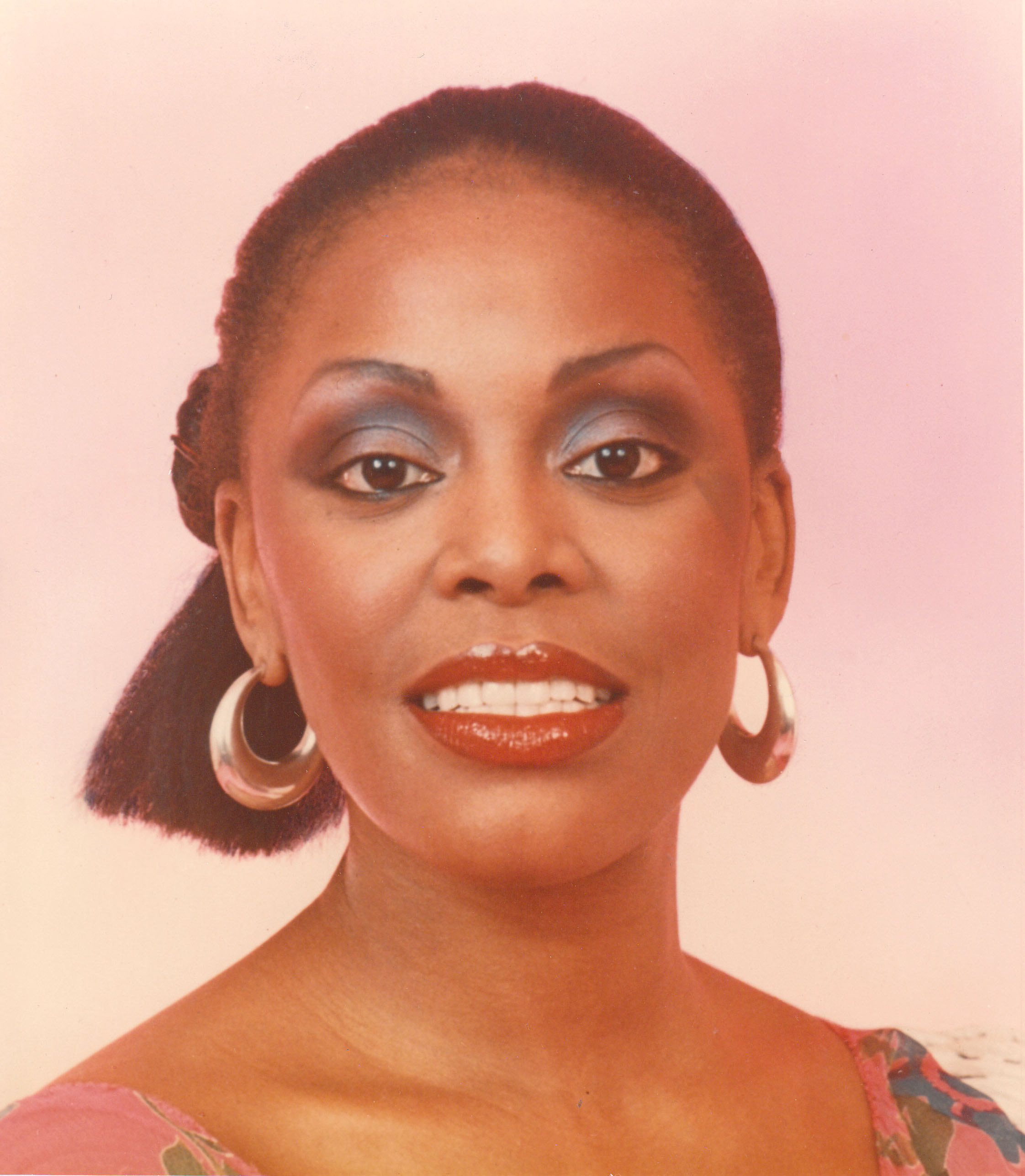

Background information
- Born: Eleanor Ann Robinson; February 3, 1945; Yakima, Washington
- Died: October 15, 1984 (aged 39) New York City, New York
- Genres: R&B, soul, disco, funk
- Occupations: Singer, songwriter, actress
- Years active: 1972–1984
- Labels: Orbit, Atlantic, Buddha, Roulette

Tasha Thomas (born Eleanor Ann Robinson; February 3, 1945 – October 15, 1984) was an American singer and actress, known for her role as Aunt Em in the original Broadway production of The Wiz. Thomas also had a hit single, "Shoot Me (With Your Love)", from her 1979 album, Midnight Rendezvous. Her birthplace is often cited as "Jeutyn, Alaska", though no such town exists.

== Music career ==
Thomas' breakthrough came when she was cast in the original Broadway production of The Wiz in the role of Aunt Em. Her performance on the cast album, singing her soulful rendition of the ballad "The Feeling We Once Had", earned her wide critical acclaim. In 1972 Tasha sang backup vocals along with singer-songwriter & Songwriters Hall of Famer Ellie Greenwich (1949–2009) for Jim Croce's debut album You Don't Mess Around With Jim. She appears on Slade's 1976 Nobody's Fools LP providing backing vocals on several songs including the title track. Tasha also provided backup vocals on the 1977 Kiss album Love Gun, as one of the "KISSettes".

In 1978, on the basis of her growing popularity as a singer capable of performing in many different styles and genres, producers James R. Glaser (aka Jimmi Hood) and Peter Rugile signed Thomas to their company, Orbit Record Productions. Her first record release on the producer's independent label, Orbit Records, was the international dance hit, "Shoot Me (With Your Love)", written by James R. Glaser. Unable to keep pace with the demand for the record, producers Glaser/Rugile took Thomas and their production company to Atlantic Records to complete Thomas's first solo album Midnight Rendezvous. Recorded in 1979, Midnight Rendezvous included the track, "Shoot Me (With Your Love)", which was the biggest hit from the album. The New York Times music critic Robert Palmer, described the song as "...one of the grittiest and most rousing disco records of the year destined to become a classic of erotic dance music."

== Television appearances ==
Following the success of "Shoot Me (With Your Love)", Thomas was frequently invited to guest star on television music and talk shows, including appearances on Don Kirshner's Rock Concert, Soul Train (season 8, episode 32 – air date: March 24, 1979), The Merv Griffin Show, (season 11, episode 2395) The Midnight Special (season 7, episode 25 – air date: May 4, 1979) and Dance Fever (May 1979).

== Death ==
Thomas died of cervical cancer on October 15, 1984, at the age of 39.

== Awards ==
"Shoot Me (With Your Love)" was nominated for "Best R&B Single of the Year" at the 1979 BMA Awards.

== Discography ==
=== Albums ===
- The Wiz (1975) Atlantic Records, ASIN: B000V6AS46
- Midnight Rendezvous (1979) Atlantic Records, ATLANTIC SD 19223 1

=== Singles ===
- "Rock-A-Bye, Baby" (2011)
- "Shoot Me (With Your Love)" – U.S. No. 91 Pop, No. 25 R&B; UK No. 59
- "Hot Buttered Boogie"
- "Street Fever"
