= Johnny Shannon =

English actor (1932–2017)

- Born: 29 July 1932; Lambeth, London, England
- Died: 17 March 2017 (aged 84); Lambeth, London, England
- Occupation: Actor
- Years active: 1970–2005

Johnny Shannon (29 July 1932 – 17 March 2017) was an English actor. Best known for his role as gangster Harry Flowers in the cult film Performance, he appeared in numerous television and film productions over a 35-year period, often playing policemen or villains in crime dramas.

== Early life and career ==
Johnny Shannon did not take up acting until he was in his late 30s. Previously, he had worked on market stalls in London and as a night driver for newspaper wholesalers. As a young man he had also been a talented amateur boxer in the heavyweight division. During his national service in the army Shannon fought numerous bouts, including against such future British boxing luminaries as Joe Erskine and Henry Cooper. Boxing out of the Fitzroy Lodge Club, Lambeth, he won the south-east London divisional heavyweight final in 1955 and reached the semi-finals of the all-London championship that same year.

In the 1960s, Shannon managed a betting shop while also working part-time as a boxing trainer.

He was in Henry Cooper's corner as a second when Cooper fought Muhammad Ali for the first time in 1963.

Shannon helped James Fox prepare for his role in the film Performance (1970) by arranging sparring sessions in the gym above the Thomas A’ Beckett pub, on the Old Kent Road, and by reading the script with him to get the accent right. Shannon was subsequently auditioned for the part of crime boss Harry Flowers in the film. Performance gained mixed reviews on initial release, but even those who disliked the film praised Shannon's work in it and he was said to have brought a new level of authenticity to the portrayal of the London gangster. On this foundation he was able to build an acting career in film and on television which lasted through the 1970s and 1980s, with occasional parts thereafter.

Among Shannon's other notable film roles were as Jack in That'll Be the Day (1973), the Agent in Slade In Flame (1975), the caged music executive in The Great Rock 'n' Roll Swindle (1980), Peter Rachman in Scandal (1989), and as a landlord in Stoned (2005). He also appeared as a policeman in the music video of Sade's Smooth Operator (1984), directed by Julien Temple.

On television, Shannon had a substantial role in the Yorkshire Television comedy drama series Beryl's Lot (1973 - 1977). He played bookie Wacky Waters, appearing in 44 of the 52 episodes broadcast. Between 1971 and 1976, he played 6 different characters in 6 separate episodes of Dixon of Dock Green. Shannon also appeared as several characters in the Thames Television comedy-drama series Minder. His first appearance was in the episode A Tethered Goat, in which he appeared as George Lewis, the owner of an escort agency. He later played "Roly-Poly Peter" in the episode Second Hand Pose. Other television appearances included: EastEnders, Z-Cars, Fawlty Towers, The Sweeney, The Bill and as London Gangster Charlie Turkel in The Professionals episode Old Dog with New Tricks.

== Later life and death ==
In 2012 Johnny Shannon was photographed for John Claridge's series of portraits of members of the London Ex-Boxers Association. He died in Lambeth on 17 March 2017, at the age of 84.

== Filmography ==
Year	Title	Role	Notes
1970	Performance	Harry Flowers	
1971	Villain	Heavy	Uncredited
1972	Hide and Seek	Wykes	
1972	Something to Hide	Lorry Driver	
1973	That'll Be the Day	Jack	
1975	Slade in Flame	Ron Harding	
1977	Sweeney!	Scotland Yard Duty Sgt.	
1978	Sweeney 2	Harry - Villain	
1980	The Great Rock 'n' Roll Swindle	Man in Prison Cage	
1983	Runners	The Hotel - Desk Porter	
1986	Absolute Beginners	Saltzman	
1987	Running Out of Luck		
1989	Scandal	Peter Rachman	
2005	Stoned	Landlord	
