= Slade in Flame (album) =

1974 album by Slade

Soundtrack album by Slade
- Released: 29 November 1974
- Genres: Glam rock; hard rock
- Length: 41:20
- Labels: Polydor (UK); Warner Bros. (US)
- Producer: Chas Chandler

Slade chronology
Old New Borrowed and Blue (1974)	Slade in Flame (1974)	Nobody's Fools (1976)

Singles from Slade in Flame
- 1. "Far Far Away" Released: 11 October 1974; 2. "How Does It Feel" Released: 7 February 1975

Slade in Flame is the first soundtrack album and fifth studio album by the British rock group Slade. It was released on 29 November 1974, reached No. 6 in the UK and was certified Gold by BPI in February 1975. The album was produced by Chas Chandler and contains songs featured in the band's film of the same name. The band tried to give the album a "sixties" feel, as the film was set in 1966.

In the US, the album was released on the Warner Bros. label, with "The Bangin' Man" replacing "Summer Song (Wishing You Were Here)" & "Thanks for the Memory" replacing "Heaven Knows". A re-issue of the album in 2015 saw Salvo Sound & Vision release a repackaged CD + DVD version of the album and film. BMG re-released the soundtrack album on splatter vinyl on 26 November 2021.

"So Far So Good" was covered by Alice Cooper songwriter Mike Bruce on his 1975 solo album In My Own Way. In a 1989 fan club interview, drummer Don Powell singled out "Standin' On the Corner" as one of the band's best efforts on record: "It's got a great swing to it and it's the first time we even used brass."

== Background ==
"Far Far Away"
Slade's first and only #1 hit in Norway

"How Does It Feel"
Theme for Slade's film in Flame

By 1974, Slade had become a big success in the UK, Europe and beyond; however, the band felt that continuing to provide 'more of the same' was not what they wanted to do. The band's manager Chas Chandler suggested Slade do a movie, to which the band agreed. Rather than producing a film portraying the band's "happy-go-lucky" image, the subject matter was based on the gritty tale of the rise and fall of a fictional 1960s group called Flame. The script, written by Andrew Birkin and Dave Humphries, was largely based on true music business events that had occurred to Slade and other groups of the time.

To accompany the film, lead vocalist Noddy Holder and bassist Jim Lea began writing material for a soundtrack album, which would continue to see the band break out of their successful formula and try different musical ideas. Having completed a fifth US tour, the band spent a month recording the new album. In October 1974, the lead single "Far Far Away" was released and reached No. 2 in the UK. The Slade in Flame album followed in November, peaking at No. 6. Though the record was lauded by critics, the album did not sell as well as expected, particularly as the band's previous three albums had all reached number one.

While Slade in Flame was clearly a distinct step forward for Slade, it also marked the end of their reign as the UK's favourite band. Far Far Away performed respectably in the UK, but the album's opening track (and next single), the ballad How Does It Feel, had such a different sound from the British teeny pop scene of the day that it reflected the gulf between where Slade were at and what was expected of them. Although regarded, thirty years on, as one of the greatest rock films, at the time the movie itself (released in January 1975) hardly helped matters. Slade's audience were used to Slade delivering a rollicking good time whereas the movie's bleak, sour atmosphere had understandably confused rather than enthused fans.

== Release ==
The album was originally scheduled for release on 22 November 1974 but Polydor were unable to produce enough copies to cover pre-order sales. Prior to its release, the album was awarded a Gold Disc based on pre-order sales. By February 1975, the album had surpassed 200,000 sales in the UK.

== Critical reception ==
Professional ratings
Review scores
Source	Rating
AllMusic	4/5 stars
Q	4/5 stars

Upon release, Record Mirror commented that "because Flame is set in the 1960s, the album has a distinctive 1960's flavour", but also noted: "[As] the songs have been taken out of context, a few of them have lost their charm and meaning but nevertheless, it is an enjoyable elpee." In 1976, Record Mirror would vote the album No. 5 on their list of the Top 10 best albums of 1975. Disc said: "The music included here certainly sounds like the Slade we all know and love. Only occasionally, do they stray from the usual mould. A touchy album but definitely more good than bad."

After the film was shown on British TV in December 1987, London Evening Standard advised people to listen to the soundtrack instead of watching the movie. In 2007, Classic Rock listed Slade in Flame as No. 18 on their "49 Best Soundtrack Albums" list.

Geoff Ginsberg of AllMusic retrospectively said: "Slade in Flame is a tough album to judge. Made as an accompanying piece to the movie of the same name, it was different than the group's other records. It's an artistic tour de force for a band that was looked on as "just a good time." Although Slade was that, the band had a lot more in its bag of tricks, and this album shows it. Don't worry, though, because it's still pure Slade."

== Track listing ==
=== UK track listing ===
All tracks are written by Noddy Holder and Jim Lea.

Side one
No.	Title	Length
1.	"How Does It Feel"	5:54
2.	"Them Kinda Monkeys Can't Swing"	3:27
3.	"So Far So Good"	3:02
4.	"Summer Song (Wishing You Were Here)"	3:36
5.	"O.K. Yesterday Was Yesterday"	3:58

Side two
No.	Title	Length
6.	"Far Far Away"	3:37
7.	"This Girl"	3:32
8.	"Lay It Down"	4:08
9.	"Heaven Knows"	3:55
10.	"Standin' On the Corner"	4:54

Japanese '24 Bit remaster 2006' bonus tracks
No.	Title	Length
11.	"Thanks for the Memory" (non-album single "Thanks for the Memory")	4:34
12.	"Raining in My Champagne" (B-side of single "Thanks for the Memory")	4:07

=== US track listing ===
All tracks are written by Noddy Holder and Jim Lea.

Side one
No.	Title	Length
1.	"How Does It Feel"	5:54
2.	"Them Kinda Monkeys Can't Swing"	3:27
3.	"So Far So Good"	3:02
4.	"The Bangin' Man"	4:11
5.	"O.K. Yesterday Was Yesterday"	3:58

Side two
No.	Title	Length
6.	"Far Far Away"	3:37
7.	"This Girl"	3:32
8.	"Lay It Down"	4:08
9.	"Thanks for the Memory"	4:33
10.	"Standin' On the Corner"	4:54

^{1} Listed as "Thanks for the Memories"

== Personnel ==
Slade

- Noddy Holder – lead vocals, rhythm guitar
- Dave Hill – lead guitar, backing vocals
- Jim Lea – bass, piano, backing vocals
- Don Powell – drums

Additional personnel

- Chas Chandler – producer
- Alan O'Duffey – engineer
- Bud Beadle – baritone saxophone
- Ron Carthy, Eddie Quansah – trumpet
- Mick Eve, Steve Gregory – tenor saxophone
- Malcolm Griffiths, Chris Hammer Smith – trombone
- Chris Mercer – baritone, tenor saxophone
- Paul Welch – art direction
- Wadewood Associates – art design
- Steve Ridgeway – logo design
- Welbeck Photography – production stills
- Gered Mankowitz – photography (front, back and portrait photos)

== Charts ==
Chart performance for Slade in Flame
Chart (1974–75)	Peak position
Australian Albums (Kent Music Report)	25
Finnish Albums (Suomen virallinen lista)	10
German Albums (Offizielle Top 100)	41
Norwegian Albums (VG-lista)	2
UK Albums (Official Charts)	6
US Billboard 200	93
US Cash Box Top Albums (101 to 200)	183

Chart (2021)	Peak position
UK Rock & Metal Albums (Official Charts)	29

== Certifications ==
Region	Certification	Certified units/sales
United Kingdom (BPI)	Gold	100,000^{^}
^{^} Shipments figures based on certification alone.
