= Far Far Away (song) =

Single by Slade

from the album Slade in Flame
- B-side: "O.K. Yesterday Was Yesterday"
- Released: 11 October 1974
- Genre: Glam rock
- Length: 3:33
- Label: Polydor
- Songwriters: Noddy Holder, Jim Lea
- Producer: Chas Chandler

Slade singles chronology
"The Bangin' Man" (1974)	"Far Far Away" (1974)	"How Does It Feel" (1975)

Video
- "Far Far Away" at TopPop on YouTube

Alternative Cover
- German 1993 reissue of "Far Far Away".

"Far Far Away" is a song by the British rock band Slade, released in 1974 as the lead single from the band's first soundtrack album and fifth studio album Slade in Flame, in promotion of the upcoming film of the same name. The song was written by lead vocalist Noddy Holder and bassist Jim Lea, and produced by Chas Chandler. It reached No. 2 in the UK, remaining in the charts for six weeks. The song was certified UK Silver by BPI in November 1974.

== Background ==
By 1974, Slade had become a big success in the UK, Europe and beyond; however, the band felt that continuing to provide 'more of the same' was not what they wanted to do. Their manager Chas Chandler suggested they do a movie, to which the band agreed. To accompany the film, Holder and Lea began writing material for a soundtrack album, which would continue to see the band break out of their successful formula and try different musical ideas. "Far Far Away" was selected as the album's lead single and was released in October 1974, reaching No. 2 in the UK.

"Far Far Away" originated with Holder. While on tour in America, he came up with the opening line while sitting on a balcony overlooking the Mississippi river in Memphis. Manager Chas Chandler urged him to go away and write the song immediately. Holder went to his hotel room and returned half an hour later having completed a basic version of the song, with the title "Letting Loose Around the World". Lea later developed the song further, in particular the chorus. In the band's 1984 biography Feel the Noize!, Lea recalled: ""Far Far Away" was a real collaboration between Nod and myself. The verse was Nod's and the chorus was mine. I wanted to record it like a barrelhouse song with a very airy feel for us but Chas wasn't keen."

In a 1986 fan club interview, guitarist Dave Hill spoke of the song's lyrics: "The song was written about being abroad wasn't it? "Yellow lights go down the Mississippi" and all that - being in the States and wanting to go back home. They were just experiences. Obviously, when you are on the road, you are writing about being on the road, you're writing about what's going on." Holder has cited the song as his favourite Slade song, while drummer Don Powell has stated it to be one of his favourites. Holder recalled in the late 1990s: "The atmosphere, the feel of it, the melody and the lyric, it all sat into place."

== Release ==
"Far Far Away" was released on 7" vinyl by Polydor Records in the UK, Ireland, across Europe, Australia, New Zealand and the Philippines. The B-side, "O.K. Yesterday Was Yesterday", would appear as an album track on Slade in Flame. Later in 1975, a 7" flexi-disc was released in the UK by Smiths Crisps as part of their "Chart Busters" series. "Far Far Away" was the A-side, with "Thanks for the Memory (Wham Bam Thank You Mam)" as the B-side. In 1989, a re-issue of the single in the Netherlands was released by BR Music. It featured "How Does It Feel" as the B-side.

In 1992, the song featured on the Soundtrack of the German film Go Trabi Go 2: Das war der Wilde Osten and in the following year the fashion label C&A produced a TV advertisement ("Don Quixote") which used the song. Following the rising popularity of the advert, "Far Far Away" was re-released in Germany that year on 7" and CD formats. It reached No. 19 on the German Singles Chart.

== Promotion ==
A music video was filmed to promote the single, which was filmed by the same film crew the band were working with for the filming of Flame. Lea later recalled the video would have been directed by either Gavrik Lasey or Richard Loncraine. The video features the band performing the song while wearing their "Flame" outfits. In Germany, the band performed the song on the TV show Disco. The band also performed the song on the Dutch AVRO TV show TopPop.

== Critical reception ==
Upon its release, Sue Byrom of Record & Popswop Mirror selected "Far Far Away" as the "pick of the week" and wrote, "Want a surprise? Then listen to this Slade single. This is a very melodic Noddy, no screaming or shouting – practically gentle by Slade standards, but it's very good, strong chorus line and backing. Just the name Slade normally means an instant hit, in this case, it'll be a well-deserved hit." Dave Lewis of the Shepherds Bush Gazette and Hammersmith Post called it an "easy, mid-paced ballad" on which "Noddy croon[s] to the rhythm of strumming guitars" and noted that "once again there's a magnetic, sing-along chorus". He continued, "No matter what you may think about Slade musically, you've got to admit they're not afraid to try something new on their singles."

The Thanet Times praised it as "by far, far and away the best thing to come from Slade this year" and believed it "could be the one to pull back some of their diminished support". Sidney Nelson of the Nottingham Evening Post stated, "It is loud but not raucous, alive but not frantic, and above all catchy. You will join in after two plays and that means a hit for Slade's best in ages." The Lincoln, Rutland & Stamford Mercury called it a "rather nice ballad number instead of the usual teeny bopper music Slade produce" and added that "it deserves more success than anything else they have done". Pete Butterfield of the Reading Evening Post wrote, "A smoother Slade, if you can imagine that, and I'm not sure whether I like it or not. I preferred them when they were boot boys, I think."

== Track listings and formats ==
7" single

1. "Far Far Away" – 3:33
2. "O.K. Yesterday Was Yesterday" – 3:51

7" single (1975 Smiths Chart Busters release)

1. "Far Far Away" – 3:33
2. "Thanks for the Memory (Wham Bam Thank You Mam)" – 4:33

7" single (Dutch 1989 release)

1. "Far Far Away" – 3:33
2. "How Does It Feel" – 5:55

7" single (German 1993 release)

1. "Far Far Away" – 3:33
2. "Skweeze Me Pleeze Me" – 4:26

CD single (German 1993 release)

1. "Far Far Away" – 3:34
2. "Mama Weer All Crazee Now" – 3:41
3. "Skweeze Me Pleeze Me" – 4:26

CD single (German 1993 release, cardboard version)

1. "Far Far Away" – 3:34
2. "Skweeze Me Pleeze Me" – 4:26

== Personnel ==
Slade

- Noddy Holder – lead vocals, guitar
- Dave Hill – lead guitar, backing vocals
- Jim Lea – bass, organ, backing vocals
- Don Powell – drums

Production

- Chas Chandler – producer

== Charts ==
=== Weekly charts ===
Weekly chart performance for "Far Far Away"
Chart (1975)	Peak position
Australia (Kent Music Report)	17
Belgium (Ultratop 50 Flanders)	24
Belgium (Ultratop 50 Wallonia)	2
Finland (Suomen virallinen lista)	12
Ireland (IRMA)	2
Netherlands (Dutch Top 40)	15
Netherlands (Single Top 100)	13
Norway (VG-lista)	1
UK Singles (Official Charts)	2
West Germany (GfK)	8

=== 1993 German reissue ===
1993 weekly chart performance for "Far Far Away"
Chart (1993)	Peak position
Germany (GfK)	19

1993 year-end chart performance for "Far Far Away"
Chart (1993)	Position
Germany (Media Control)	82
