= Slade in Flame =

- Film poster by Arnaldo Putzu
- Directed by: Richard Loncraine
- Written by: Andrew Birkin (screenplay); Dave Humphries (additional dialogue)
- Produced by: Gavrik Losey
- Starring: Noddy Holder; Dave Hill; Don Powell; Jim Lea; Tom Conti; Alan Lake
- Cinematography: Peter Hannan
- Edited by: Michael Bradsell
- Music by: Slade
- Production company: Goodtimes Enterprises
- Distributed by: Visual Programme Systems (UK)
- Release date: January 1975
- Running time: 90 minutes
- Country: United Kingdom
- Box office: $1 million (UK)

Slade in Flame (also known as Flame) is a 1975 musical film starring the British rock band Slade. It was directed by Richard Loncraine and written by Andrew Birkin with additional dialogue by Dave Humphries. The film includes supporting roles by Tom Conti, Alan Lake and Johnny Shannon. In November 1974, the band's soundtrack album of the same name was released prior to the film.

The film charts the history of "Flame", a fictitious group in the late 1960s who are picked up by a marketing company and taken to the top, only to break up at their zenith. Described as the "Citizen Kane of rock musicals" by BBC film critic Mark Kermode, the film went on to achieve critical acclaim years after the mixed feelings on its original release.

Slade in Flame has been released in VHS and DVD form, and was re-mastered and released in its original Cinemascope wide-screen format on DVD for the first time in 2007. The set also featured the soundtrack album. In 2015, Salvo Sound & Vision issued a repackaged CD and DVD version of the album and film.

A paperback book was released, based on the film, written by John Pidgeon. It was the largest printing that the publisher Panther had done for the home market at 250,000 copies.

== Plot ==
In the beginning, the future members of Flame are playing in two rival bands. The first band includes singer Jack Daniels (Alan Lake), guitarist Barry (Dave Hill) and bassist Paul (Jim Lea). They are managed by a local agency run by Ron Harding (Johnny Shannon). The other band, Roy Priest and the Undertakers, is fronted by Stoker (Noddy Holder). Soon after playing a wedding gig, Daniels' band auditions for a new drummer and take on Charlie (Don Powell). Playing at a small venue, the band runs into the Undertakers, who are the following act that night. The Undertakers' performance is ruined after Daniels locks Stoker in his stage coffin. Having stopped at a roadside cafe after leaving the venue, Daniels and his band, along with Barry's girlfriend Angie (Sara Clee), are forced to make a hasty getaway when the Undertakers arrive looking for them. A car chase results in Daniels crashing and the police arresting both bands.

In the cell at the local police station, Paul is properly introduced to Stoker. Soon after their release, he visits him at his market job to offer him Daniels' place in the band. Stoker agrees to take the part, with the Undertakers having disbanded. Meanwhile, Barry approaches his friend Russell (Anthony Allen), who agrees to his offer of becoming their roadie. The newly-formed band soon play their first performance at a small club, which is seen by both Harding and a talent scout Tony Devlin (Kenneth Colley). After the show, an argument develops between Harding and Stoker, resulting in Harding dropping them from his agency. Soon afterwards, Stoker receives a letter from Devlin, on behalf of a London-based agency run by Robert Seymour (Tom Conti). Offering to take on the band, they travel to London to meet Seymour and agree to sign with his agency.

Now named "Flame", the band release their first record, which quickly becomes a hit. As part of its promotion, they arrive by boat to a pirate radio station "Radio City", based in the Thames estuary. During their interview on the Ricky Storm Show (Tommy Vance), the station is attacked by gunfire and the band escape by helicopter. The resulting front-page news boosts their publicity, pushing further sales of their hit record. The new-found fame brings pressure on the members, who are busy with constant touring and recording. At a record company party to celebrate the band's fifth hit record, which had just gone Silver, their former agent Harding turns up to inform Seymour that they are still under contract to his agency and tries to stake a claim to their earnings. Setting up a meeting with Harding at his office, Seymour uses Daniels to get hold of the band's contract with Harding. Daniels is successful in stealing it and after the meeting with Seymour, Harding is unable to produce proof of his contract with the band. Realising Daniels was recently in the office to collect his work schedule, Harding soon sends his thugs to retrieve the contract. Finding Daniels, the thugs sever his toes after discovering the money he was paid for stealing the contract.

Meanwhile, Flame are in the studio with Seymour and Devlin, trying to record new material. However, the forming factions within the group continue, particularly between Stoker and Paul. After being sent out to buy some beverages, Russell is confronted by Harding's thugs, who give him photographs of Daniels' injuries. On his return to the studio, Russell informs Seymour, who chooses to ignore the threat and Russell then decides to quit as roadie. Soon after, Harding turns up unexpectedly at Seymour's office, who angrily turns him away. On the final date of their sell-out tour, Flame continue struggling with escalating tensions between Stoker and Paul. Ultimately, after the show, Paul decides to leave the band, packs and heads home. Having appeared briefly backstage at Flame's concert, Seymour and his family return home, only to find Harding's thugs have trashed his daughter's bedroom, leaving a teddy ripped apart with "rock a bye baby" written in red paint on the wall above. The following morning at the hotel, Harding arrives to inform Stoker that Seymour has relinquished the band's contract to Harding. However, Stoker then reveals they have split up and exits the room.

== Cast ==
- Noddy Holder as Stoker
- Jim Lea as Paul
- Dave Hill as Barry
- Don Powell as Charlie
- Tom Conti as Robert Seymour
- Alan Lake as Jack Daniels
- Johnny Shannon as Ron Harding
- Kenneth Colley as Tony Devlin
- Tommy Vance as Ricky Storm
- Emperor Rosko as himself
- Anthony Allen as Russell
- Sara Clee as Angie

== Production ==
By 1974, Slade had become a big success in the UK, Europe and beyond; however the band felt that continuing to provide 'more of the same' was not what they wanted to do. The band's manager Chas Chandler suggested that Slade do a movie, to which the band agreed. They dismissed the idea of "a Hard Day's Night sort of slapstick, speeded-up film, runaround type thing" as too obvious. Slade were offered a number of suggestions for a movie screenplay, such as Quite a Mess, a comedy reworking of The Quatermass Experiment, where Dave Hill would be the experiment of the title, only to be killed off by a "Triffid thing" in the first fifteen minutes.

Rather than producing a film portraying the band's "happy-go-lucky" image, the band accepted Slade in Flame, as "a sort of behind-the-scenes, nitty-gritty look at the rock 'n' roll business". The approved screenplay from Andrew Birkin depicted the rise and fall of a fictional 1960s group called Flame. However, the band felt that the original story failed to capture the true feel of the music industry. They decided to invite Birkin and director Richard Loncraine to join the band on their tour in America for six weeks so that they could experience the live shows and, while travelling between locations, record anecdotes from Slade about themselves and other bands. Most of these anecdotes, about incidents that had happened to both Slade and other bands, would be incorporated into the script for Flame. Examples included the lead singer of one band being locked in a coffin, which happened in real life to Screaming Lord Sutch, and another being "roughed up" by associates of his former agent who still had a claim on the band. Another anecdote, of the band's minibus breaking down on the way to one of their first major gigs, and a nearby rugby team interrupting their training to help the band push it the rest of the way, something which had happened to Slade earlier in their career, was filmed but didn't make it to the final cut.

To accompany the film, lead vocalist Noddy Holder and bassist Jim Lea began writing material for a soundtrack album, which would continue to see the band break out of their successful formula and try different musical ideas. Having completed their fifth U.S. tour, the band spent a month recording the new album. Released in November 1974, the Slade in Flame album reached No. 6 in the UK, and included the two hit singles "Far Far Away" and "How Does It Feel".

== Release ==
Released in January 1975, Slade in Flame was met with a mixed response, particularly from fans who did not expect the band to produce a film with a bleak and sour atmosphere. The band also began to suffer a commercial decline from this time. Later, the band felt that the amount of time they were out of the public eye making the film could have contributed to their chart decline, and that the gritty "reality" of the movie may have done Slade more harm than good. In 1979, Holder recalled: "It just took such a big chunk out of our career, we didn't tour for a long time, we were not able to record for a long time, or write." In 2007, he added: "The teen audience didn't get it – we half expected that to happen but it was no good us catering for that audience. Making a movie was a totally different ball game to anything we'd done before – we could not make a credible movie and expect it to entertain that young market of ours."

The premiere of the movie was held at The Metropole Theatre, Victoria in London on 13 February 1975. The skies that evening were lit up by searchlights and the band arrived on the back of a vintage fire engine. Guests in attendance were Lynsey de Paul, Chas Chandler, Alan Lake and his wife Diana Dors, Lulu, Roy Wood, The Sweet, Gary Glitter, Alan Price and his wife, Kiki Dee, Rosko, The Troggs and their wives, Jeff Relle, Colin Blunstone, Susan Hanson, Barry Blue, Mud, Bill Oddie, Arrows, Suzi Quatro and Pilot.

The film was released in different regions across the UK on different dates, allowing the distributor to promote and advertise it on regional ITV stations, and potentially for the band to make promotional appearances, too. For example, it opened in the Tyne Tees (Newcastle and district) and Yorkshire (Leeds and district) areas on 19 January 1975, and in London (north and south) area on 16 February, three days after its official premiere at the Metropole.

== Reception ==
Upon release, Sounds said: "Slade play themselves at least as well as they usually do, and in Noddy Holder in particular, they have a natural scene-stealer. Flame is basically the same old story, told more accurately and wittingly. Unlike Stardust, it has strong music and stage image at the centre of it all, proving that Slade haven't lost their touch, and the music shines through." Disc commented: "I found the film interesting, purely to judge Slade's acting talents. Noddy came out best. He obviously found the whole thing a cinch, and was surprisingly natural. Don was good too. Jim was runner-up, and gave a fair performance. A film that Slade fans can't miss, a film that will make very interesting viewing if you like to see a handful of scenes that go behind the making of a pop star. Judge for yourself!"

The film received its first broadcast on British TV in December 1987, which was followed by a number of reviews in the press. Today wrote: "The pop group Slade in surprisingly sharp satire about the rise and fall of a band – not entirely unlike themselves." London Evening Standard commented: "Old hat story of a pop groups rise and fall given some mild interest by the clash between the band and the manager's background. Otherwise listen to the soundtrack." The Guardian said: "Shrewdly discerning examination of the mid-Sixties pop music scene using the rise and fall of a band played by Slade to comment sharply on media manipulation and the strain of snatched success."

In a retrospective DVD review, Joe Geesin of the webzine Get Ready to Rock! wrote: "Slade – you either love them or hate them, but if you're a fan this DVD is essential viewing. Issued in the USA, it's well worth picking up, because the music at least ends up pretty good, and the gags are good too." In 2012, Fife Today commented: "The members of Slade equip themselves surprisingly well as actors, Noddy Holder being the pick of the bunch. This excellent film stands up well as both a document of the music industry's less appealing side and as a snapshot of late 60s working class Britain. And of course, the music is superb." In 2007, Classic Rock listed the film at No. 42 in the "Hollywood Rocks: 50 Greatest Rock Movies" list.

In 2007, BBC film critic Mark Kermode called it the "Citizen Kane of rock musicals" and included its soundtrack among the 50 greatest soundtracks in cinema's history. Later in 2012, he selected the film as a Kermode Uncut Film Club choice on his BBC film blog. In November 2024, Noize Books released the book 'Slade In Flame At 50' to coincide with the 50th anniversary of the release of the soundtrack album, a thoroughly detailed examination of all things to do with the Flame era of Slade's career.

The BFI has remastered Slade in Flame and on 19th May 2025 will release it for the first time on Blu-ray.
