= How Does It Feel (Slade song) =

Single by Slade

from the album Slade in Flame
- B-side: "So Far So Good"
- Released: 7 February 1975; September 1975 (US)
- Length: 3:15 (US single version); 4:46 (single version); 5:55 (album version)
- Label: Polydor
- Songwriters: Noddy Holder; Jim Lea
- Producer: Chas Chandler

Slade singles chronology
| "Far Far Away" (1974) | "How Does It Feel" (1975) | "Thanks for the Memory (Wham Bam Thank You Mam)" (1975) |

Audio sample
- file; help

Alternative Cover
- Dutch cover of "How Does It Feel".

"How Does It Feel" is song by the British rock band Slade, released in 1975 as the second single from the band's first soundtrack album and fifth studio album Slade in Flame, in promotion of the film of the same name. The song was written by lead vocalist Noddy Holder and bassist Jim Lea, and produced by Chas Chandler. It reached No. 15 in the UK, remaining in the charts for seven weeks.

== Background ==
By 1974, Slade had become a big success in the UK, Europe and beyond; however the band felt that continuing to provide 'more of the same' was not what they wanted to do. Their manager Chas Chandler suggested they do a movie, to which the band agreed. To accompany the film, Holder and Lea began writing material for a soundtrack album, which would continue to see the band break out of their successful formula and try different musical ideas. In late 1974, the lead single "Far Far Away" had reached No. 2, while Slade in Flame peaked at No. 6. Following the film's release in January 1975, it was decided to release "How Does It Feel" as the second single the following month. It reached No. 15, which was the band's first single not to reach the UK Top 5 since their 1971 breakthrough with "Get Down and Get with It".

The melody of "How Does It Feel" was the first Lea had ever written, while he was still in school. He came up with the idea on an old piano which he later described as having half the keys missing. Although the tune never developed any further at that time, Lea later revisited it for use as the theme tune for Flame. Holder wrote the song's lyrics and it became "How Does It Feel". The song featured a brass section, performed by members of Gonzalez. In the band's 1984 biography Feel the Noize!, Lea recalled: "It was an old song that I'd written and Nod put some great lyrics to it. Tommy Vance said that it was good but that we were in for a hard time. But it didn't matter to me whether it was number one or number 15... to me it was a much better record than we'd made before and that was all I cared about."

Despite the song's disappointing charting, "How Does It Feel" is now widely considered as one of the band's finest songs. In 1999, Noel Gallagher of Oasis said the song was "one of the best songs written, in the history of pop, ever". In a 1986 fan club interview, guitarist Dave Hill spoke of the song: "It was totally different to anything we had ever done before, but you see we were capable of that sort of thing, though our manager/producer Chas Chandler used to keep us clear from that. Trying to be too clever was considered at the time to be going in another direction."

== Release ==
"How Does It Feel" was released on 7" vinyl by Polydor Records in the UK, Ireland, across Europe, Scandinavia, Yugoslavia, Australia and Japan. In America, it was released by Warner Bros. Records in September 1975. The B-side on the Polydor releases of the single was the Slade in Flame album track "So Far So Good". In America, "O.K. Yesterday Was Yesterday" featured as the B-side, also taken from Slade in Flame. In the UK, the first 200,000 copies of the single featured a colour sleeve.

== Promotion ==
No music video was created to promote the single. In the UK, the band performed the song on the music show Top of the Pops, The Russell Harty Show and the children's show Crackerjack. The band also performed the song on the Dutch AVRO TV show TopPop.

== Critical reception ==
Upon its release as a single, Sue Byrom of Record & Popswop Mirror noted "How Does It Feel" was "very different from the usual Slade material", with "far less reliance on guitars and far more on an orchestral arrangement". She continued, "There's a gentle piano intro before Noddy comes in, singing in an almost subdued voice. Even when the song kicks off, the arrangement is very different. [It will] be interesting to see the fans' reaction, but I don't think they'll have too much trouble succeeding." Barry Nelson of the Cheshire Observer remarked how Slade had gone from "straightforward 'yob-rock' band" to "tak[ing] tentative steps towards musical creativity" which "seems to be an admirable thing once the shock wears off". He felt the song was "infinitely more palatable than a lot of current releases" and added, "I hope that Noddy is rewarded for his initiative by an increased rather than a decreased following." The Shepherds Bush Gazette and Hammersmith Post called it a "quiet, melodic record" which "follows the tradition set" by the preceding single, "Far Far Away" and concluded, "It's a long way from the raucous Slade of yesteryear, but I'm sure it'll get plenty of plays and do pretty well for itself."

John Hutson of the Thanet Times noted that the song, which he considered "another slow" one like "Far Far Away", "builds up to include crashing guitar chords together with some nice orchestration and piano work". James Belsey of the Bristol Evening Post wrote, "One of the best tracks from Flame, starting slow and sensitive, breaking into heavy and then alternating between rock and orchestra. The hook is Noddy Holder's voice, and it's excellent." Sidney Nelson of the Nottingham Evening Post commented that it "starts off slowly and gets only marginally more up tempo" and how the "restrained Holder voice comes over well on this brush with melody". In the US, Cash Box stated, "It's a change of pace for Slade as the English thrashers have come up with an effective, almost ballad-like, single that contains the band's smoke without all the fire. Effective vocals and tight licks make this a record that's up on all fours."

== Formats ==
7" single

1. "How Does It Feel" - 4:46
2. "So Far So Good" - 2:59

7" single (US release)

1. "How Does It Feel" - 3:15
2. "O.K. Yesterday Was Yesterday" - 3:58

7" single (US promo)

1. "How Does It Feel" - 3:15
2. "How Does It Feel" - 3:15

== Personnel ==
Slade

- Noddy Holder - lead vocals, guitar
- Dave Hill - lead guitar, backing vocals
- Jim Lea - bass guitar, piano, organ, backing vocals
- Don Powell - drums

Additional personnel

- Members of Gonzalez - brass section
- Chas Chandler - producer

== Charts ==
| Chart (1975) | Peak position |
|---|---|
| Belgium (Ultratop 50 Wallonia) | 45 |
| Ireland (IRMA) | 11 |
| Netherlands (Tipparade) | 9 |
| UK Singles (OCC) | 15 |
| West Germany (GfK) | 36 |
