= Dorset Echo =

Daily newspaper published in the county of Dorset, England

- Type: Daily newspaper
- Format: Tabloid
- Owner: USA Today Co.
- Publisher: Newsquest
- Editor: Diarmuid MacDonagh
- Headquarters: Weymouth, Dorset
- Circulation: 3,869 (as of 2024)
- ISSN: 2515-852X
- Website: dorsetecho.co.uk

The Dorset Echo is a daily newspaper published in the county of Dorset, England.

The title publishes Monday to Saturday from editorial offices in Weymouth, and covers issues concerning south, central and west Dorset.

The Dorset Echo is a sister paper to the Bournemouth based Daily Echo and is owned by the Newsquest Media Group. In the period December 2010–June 2011, it had an average daily circulation of 17,429. This had dropped to an audited average daily circulation of 9,331 for the period July 2017–December 2017. This dropped again sharply to 3838 July 2024 to December 2024
