= Slayed? =

Studio album by Slade
- Released: 1 December 1972
- Recorded: 1972
- Genres: Glam rock; hard rock
- Length: 34:30
- Label: Polydor (UK/US)
- Producer: Chas Chandler

Slade chronology
Slade Alive! (1972)	Slayed? (1972)	Sladest (1973)

Singles from Slayed?
- 1. "Mama Weer All Crazee Now" Released: 25 August 1972; 2. "The Whole World's Goin' Crazee" Released: October 1972 (promo only); 3. "Gudbuy T'Jane" Released: 17 November 1972; 4. "Let the Good Times Roll" Released: August 1973 (US only); 5. "Move Over" Released: November 1973 (Japan only)

Slayed? is the third studio album by the British rock group Slade. It was released on 1 December 1972 and reached No. 1 in the UK. It remained on the chart for 34 weeks and was certified Silver in early 1973. The album was also the band's most successful of the 1970s in the US, peaking at No. 69 and remaining in the charts for 26 weeks. In Australia, the album reached No. 1 and went Gold, knocking the band's live album Slade Alive! to No. 2. Slayed? was produced by Chas Chandler.

== Background ==
After achieving their breakthrough hit with "Get Down and Get with It" in 1971, Slade would continue to achieve further success with their follow-up singles "Coz I Luv You", "Look Wot You Dun" and "Take Me Bak 'Ome". The 1972 live album Slade Alive! also gave the band their first success on the albums chart, reaching No. 2. Having achieved their second UK number one with "Take Me Bak 'Ome", the band soon finished recording their next studio album Slayed?. In August 1972, the lead single "Mama Weer All Crazee Now" was released and was another UK chart topper. Slayed? followed in December and reached No. 1. A second single, "Gudbuy T'Jane", was also released that month and reached No. 2 in the UK.

In October, "The Whole World's Goin' Crazee" was released as a free 7" Flexi disc with the Music Scene magazine. The B-Side was "Bonnie Charlie" by Mike Hugg. In August 1973, "Let the Good Times Roll" was released as a single in America where it reached No. 114. In November, "Move Over" was released as a single in Japan.

== Song information ==
"How D'You Ride" had originally been considered as a potential single, with Chandler particularly keen on seeing it released as one. In a 2006 interview, drummer Don Powell revealed of "I Won't Let It 'Appen Agen": "If you listen to the start of that one you can hear somebody shout, 'Yeah!' That's me shouting, because it felt so good when we started, that I just couldn't help saying it. And it was kept."

The idea for "Gudbuy T'Jane" came to Lea while the band was in San Diego. He completed the song on the flight home to the UK. Holder's lyrics were inspired by a woman called Jane who demonstrated a sex machine on a TV show on which the band appeared. The idea for the lyrics of "Mama Weer All Crazee Now" came from the band's show at the Boston Gliderdrome in Lincolnshire, where a bouncer had told them about another act who'd appeared there drunk – "crazy with whiskey".

== Critical reception ==
Professional ratings
Review scores
Source	Rating
AllMusic	4/5 stars
Christgau's Record Guide	A−
The Guardian	5/5 stars

Upon release, Record Mirror described the album as "all pretty stomping, insistent and bawled out stuff", adding "they deliver the goods here, alright". In the Record Mirror poll results of 1974, Slayed? was listed at No. 4 on the Top 10 list of best British albums. New Musical Express said the album was "one of the greatest rock 'n' roll releases ever".

Robert Hilburn of the Los Angeles Times felt that aside from some "effective moments" on side one, side two best displayed Slade's "power and direction". He concluded: "If you've been missing the solid, raunchy rock sound in recent months, get slayed and play it loud." Tom Von Malder of The Wheeling Herald (Illinois) felt the album recalled the "kind of raw music that the Rolling Stones used to play when they did "Street Fighting Man"." Malder concluded: "Slade is punk, street rock at its best and loudest." American rock critic Robert Christgau felt the album showcased "boot-boy anthems that are every bit as overpowering as has been reported, and also more fun. Noddy Holder can wake up the crazee in my neighborhood any time he wants." Henry McNulty of the Hartford Courant described the album as a "fierce, unrelenting type of rock", as well as a "total body assault, leaving the mind free to wander in the void where the meaning ought to be."

In 2010, Classic Rock considered the album an "essential classic", adding that it featured "party-hard tracks, and even something approaching a ballad with "Look at Last Nite", ensuring that Slayed? inarguably ticks all the right boxes." The Guardian noted the album's singles and other tracks as being "deservedly party riff monsters", but added: "Slayed?'s majesty lies in the melancholy ballads. "Look at Last Nite's" haunting refrain fingers both empty celebrity and fame's creeping downside."

The album was included in the book 1001 Albums You Must Hear Before You Die.

== Track listing ==
Side one
No.	Title	Writer(s)	Length
1.	"How d' You Ride"	Noddy Holder, Jim Lea	3:11
2.	"The Whole World's Goin' Crazee"	Holder	3:35
3.	"Look at Last Nite"	Holder, Lea	3:05
4.	"I Won't Let It 'Appen Agen"	Lea	3:16
5.	"Move Over"	Janis Joplin	3:45

Side two
No.	Title	Writer(s)	Length
6.	"Gudbuy T'Jane"	Holder, Lea	3:32
7.	"Gudbuy Gudbuy"	Holder, Lea	3:28
8.	"Mama Weer All Crazee Now"	Holder, Lea	3:44
9.	"I Don' Mind"	Holder, Lea	3:05
10.	"Let the Good Times Roll / Feel So Fine"	Leonard Lee	3:46

Japanese '24 Bit remaster 2006' bonus tracks
No.	Title	Writer(s)	Length
11.	"Take Me Bak 'Ome" (non-album single)	Holder, Lea	3:16
12.	"Cum On Feel the Noize" (non-album single)	Holder, Lea	4:25
13.	"Skweeze Me, Pleeze Me" (non-album single)	Holder, Lea	4:30

2006 Salvo remaster bonus tracks
No.	Title	Writer(s)	Length
11.	"My Life Is Natural" (B-side of "Coz I Luv You")	Holder	3:17
12.	"Candidate" (B-side of "Look Wot You Dun")	Lea, Powell	2:52
13.	"Wonderin' Y" (B-side of "Take Me Bak 'Ome")	Lea, Powell	2:49
14.	"Man Who Speeks Evil" (B-side of "Mama Weer All Crazee Now")	Lea, Powell	3:17
15.	"Slade Talk to 'Melanie' Readers" (Issued on a single-sided flexi-disc)		6:46

== Personnel ==
Slade

- Noddy Holder – lead vocals, rhythm guitar
- Dave Hill – lead guitar, backing vocals
- Jim Lea – bass, piano, violin, backing vocals
- Don Powell – drums

Additional personnel

- Chas Chandler – producer
- Gered Mankowitz – cover photography
- Chris Charlesworth – liner notes

== Charts ==
=== Weekly charts ===
Weekly chart performance for Slayed?
Chart (1972–1973)	Peak position
Australian Albums (Kent Music Report)	1
Austrian Albums (Ö3 Austria)	3
Canada Top Albums/CDs (RPM)	27
Finnish Albums (Suomen virallinen lista)	2
German Albums (Offizielle Top 100)	10
Dutch Albums (Album Top 100)	10
Norwegian Albums (VG-lista)	3
UK Albums (Official Charts)	1
US Billboard 200	69
US Cash Box Top 100 Albums	47
US Record World The Album Chart	50

Weekly chart performance for Slayed? reissue
Chart (2021)	Position
Scottish Albums (Official Charts)	21
UK Independent Albums (Official Charts)	8

=== Year-end charts ===
Year-end chart performance for Slayed?
Chart (1973)	Position
German Albums (Offizielle Top 100)	19

== Certifications ==
Certifications for Slayed?
Region	Certification	Certified units/sales
Finland (Musiikkituottajat)	Gold	20,000
