= Live at the BBC (Slade album) =

Live album / compilation album by Slade
- Released: 28 September 2009
- Recorded: 1969–1974
- Genre: Rock
- Language: English
- Label: Salvo

Slade chronology
| In for a Penny: Raves & Faves (2007) | Live at the BBC (2009) | Merry Xmas Everybody: Party Hits (2009) |

Live at the BBC is a live compilation album by the British rock band Slade. It was released by Salvo in September 2009 and features two discs of material recorded by the band live at the BBC. The first disc comprises songs recorded for various BBC sessions between 1969–72, along with Radio One jingles recorded in 1973–74. The second disc is a twelve-song set recorded live at the Paris Theatre, London, in August 1972.

== Track listing ==
Disc 1 - Studio Sessions
| No. | Title | Writer(s) | Length |
|---|---|---|---|
| 1. | "Coming Home" | Eric Clapton, Bonnie Bramlett | 3:11 |
| 2. | "The Shape Of Things To Come" | Barry Mann, Cynthia Weil | 2:29 |
| 3. | "See Us Here" | Noddy Holder, Jim Lea, Don Powell | 3:09 |
| 4. | "Know Who You Are" | Holder, Lea, Powell, Dave Hill | 3:00 |
| 5. | "My Life Is Natural" | Holder | 3:01 |
| 6. | "Coloured Rain" | Steve Winwood, Chris Wood, Jim Capaldi | 2:50 |
| 7. | "Man Who Speeks Evil" | Lea, Powell | 3:26 |
| 8. | "Move Over" | Janis Joplin | 3:42 |
| 9. | "Omaha" | Skip Spence | 2:20 |
| 10. | "Sweet Box" | Lea, Powell | 3:01 |
| 11. | "Nights in White Satin" | Justin Hayward | 3:10 |
| 12. | "It's Alright Ma, It's Only Witchcraft" | Ashley Hutchings, Richard Thompson | 2:43 |
| 13. | "Raven" | Holder, Lea, Powell | 2:40 |
| 14. | "Gudbuy Gudbuy" | Holder, Lea | 3:30 |
| 15. | "Getting Better" | John Lennon, Paul McCartney | 2:28 |
| 16. | "Darling Be Home Soon" | John Sebastian | 5:03 |
| 17. | "Let The Good Times Roll" | Leonard Lee | 3:11 |
| 18. | "Dirty Joker" | Lea, Powell | 2:52 |
| 19. | "Get Down and Get With It" | Bobby Marchan | 3:59 |
| 20. | "Wild Winds Are Blowing" | Jack Winsley, Bob Saker | 2:28 |
| 21. | ""Radio 1, where the best music's on"" | Holder, Lea | 0:26 |
| 22. | ""Everyday the sounds we play on Radio 1"" | Holder, Lea | 0:30 |
| 23. | ""This is Radio 1, we're all having fun"" | Holder, Lea | 0:33 |
| 24. | ""We're Slade!"" | - | 0:21 |

Disc 2 - Live At The Paris Theatre, London, 17 August 1972
| No. | Title | Writer(s) | Length |
|---|---|---|---|
| 1. | "Introduction" | – | 0:41 |
| 2. | "Hear Me Calling" | Alvin Lee | 5:38 |
| 3. | "In Like A Shot (From My Gun)" | Holder, Lea, Powell | 3:45 |
| 4. | "Look Wot You Dun" | Holder, Lea, Powell | 3:37 |
| 5. | "Keep On Rocking" | Holder, Lea, Powell, Hill | 3:44 |
| 6. | "Move Over" | Joplin | 5:18 |
| 7. | "Mama Weer All Crazee Now" | Holder, Lea | 3:58 |
| 8. | "Lady Be Good" | George Gershwin, Ira Gershwin | 1:27 |
| 9. | "Coz I Luv You" | Holder, Lea | 5:08 |
| 10. | "Take Me Back 'Ome" | Holder, Lea | 4:50 |
| 11. | "Get Down and Get With It" | Marchan | 6:50 |
| 12. | "Good Golly Miss Molly" | Robert Blackwell, John Marascalco | 4:00 |

== Critical reception ==
Professional ratings
Review scores
| Source | Rating |
|---|---|
| Classic Rock | favourable |
| Daily Express | 4/5 stars |
| The Guardian | 4/5 stars |
| Mojo | 4/5 stars |
| Record Collector | 3/5 stars |
| Uncut | 4/5 stars |

Upon release, Classic Rock stated: "For those who regard Slade as nothing more than a '70s hit machine, Live at the BBC is gonna be a right old shock. This is Slade before the hits, a raw, rocking high paced crew. But then, if you ever saw them live, you'll know how good this lot were – one of the best." The Guardian said: "This is a treat, tracing the Black Country rockers' fascinating 1969-72 progress from a band Tony Blackburn introduces as "the skinhead set" to the biggest pop phenomenon since Beatlemania. These long-lost radio sessions give some feeling of how they arrived in the peace'n'love era like a force-10 gale. The second CD captures a band at the peak of their glam stomp."

Terry Staunton of Record Collector wrote of Disc One: "The disc offers an insight into the band's early versatility, though with the exception of the pounding "Know Who You Are", their self-penned material comes across as disjointed and lacking focus. Covers of Traffic, Fairport Convention and The Beatles, however, suggest levels of deft musicianship not always evident in their cacophonic hits. For Disc Two, he said: "Six-cylinder blasts through songs first heard by Ten Years After, Janis Joplin and Little Richard acknowledge their showband roots, but it's the affirmation of Holder's and Lea's fast maturing songwriting talent that marks it as a pivotal gig in the group's stratospheric career trajectory." Paul Elliott of Mojo said: "If ever a band earned the epithet "rollicking" it's these Black Country boys. Disc one [tackles] everything from The Beatles' "Getting Better" to Fairport Convention's "It's Alright Ma, It's Only Witchcraft" – a leftfield choice, but delivered with typical gusto. Disc two's live performance is Slade at their peak, banging out "Coz I Luv You" and other signature misspelt glam anthems."

Alastair McKay of Uncut commented: "Slade's cartoonish wardrobe has overshadowed what a fantastic live act they were. This two-disc set shows them growing from a hard rock showband to the ferocious outfit that dominated the 1970s charts." Daily Express stated: "T. Rex and Roxy Music may have the sexier image these days but, back in the 70s, Slade were an authentic, kick-ass rock band who could rub Oasis's noses in a muddy puddle even on their offest of off days. Noddy and the lads are captured in all their howling, stomping, gleeful glory on this double CD. The studio work shows just what first-rate musicians Slade were, while the gig showcases [their] boot-bashing classics. Fab!"

== Personnel ==
- Noddy Holder – lead vocals, rhythm guitar
- Jim Lea – bass, violin, backing vocals
- Dave Hill – lead guitar, backing vocals
- Don Powell – drums
