= Slade Alive! – The Live Anthology =

Slade Alive! - The Live Anthology

Live album by Slade
- Released: 21 August 2006
- Genre: Rock
- Label: Salvo

Slade chronology
The Very Best of Slade (2005)	Slade Alive! - The Live Anthology (2006)	The Slade Box (2006)

Slade Alive! – The Live Anthology is a two-disc live compilation album by the British rock band Slade. It was released in August 2006 by Salvo. It reached No. 191 in the UK.

The anthology includes the band's entire collection of officially released live material, with the exception of the 1982 B-Side "Merry Xmas Everybody (Live & Kickin')". Disc one contains the 1972 album Slade Alive! and the 1978 follow-up Slade Alive, Vol. 2. Disc two contains 1982's Slade on Stage and the material from the two 1980 extended plays Alive at Reading and Xmas Ear Bender.

== Track listing ==
=== Disc one ===
No.	Title	Writer(s)	Notes	Length
1.	"Hear Me Calling"	Alvin Lee	Slade Alive!	5:45
2.	"In Like a Shot From My Gun"	Noddy Holder, Jim Lea, Don Powell	Slade Alive!	3:33
3.	"Darling Be Home Soon"	John Sebastian	Slade Alive!	5:42
4.	"Know Who You Are"	Holder, Lea, Dave Hill, Powell	Slade Alive!	3:37
5.	"Keep on Rocking"	Holder, Lea, Hill, Powell	Slade Alive!	6:28
6.	"Get Down With It"	Bobby Marchan	Slade Alive!	5:32
7.	"Born to Be Wild"	Mars Bonfire	Slade Alive!	8:11
8.	"Get on Up"	Holder, Lea	Slade Alive, Vol. 2	6:01
9.	"Take Me Bak 'Ome"	Holder, Lea	Slade Alive, Vol. 2	4:19
10.	"My Baby Left Me"	Arthur Crudup	Slade Alive, Vol. 2	2:41
11.	"Be"	Holder, Lea	Slade Alive, Vol. 2	3:50
12.	"Mama Weer All Crazee Now"	Holder, Lea	Slade Alive, Vol. 2	3:58
13.	"Burning in the Heat of Love"	Holder, Lea	Slade Alive, Vol. 2	3:45
14.	"Everyday"	Holder, Lea	Slade Alive, Vol. 2	3:35
15.	"Gudbuy T'Jane"	Holder, Lea	Slade Alive, Vol. 2	4:58
16.	"One-Eyed Jacks with Moustaches"	Holder, Lea	Slade Alive, Vol. 2	3:24
17.	"C'mon Feel the Noize"	Holder, Lea	Slade Alive, Vol. 2	4:20

=== Disc two ===
No.	Title	Writer(s)	Notes	Length
1.	"Rock and Roll Preacher"	Holder, Lea	Slade on Stage	5:18
2.	"When I'm Dancin' I Ain't Fightin'"	Holder, Lea	Slade on Stage	3:42
3.	"Take Me Bak 'Ome"	Holder, Lea	Slade on Stage	4:32
4.	"Everyday"	Holder, Lea	Slade on Stage	3:18
5.	"Lock Up Your Daughters"	Holder, Lea	Slade on Stage	4:02
6.	"We'll Bring the House Down"	Holder, Lea	Slade on Stage	4:17
7.	"A Night to Remember"	Holder, Lea	Slade on Stage	8:09
8.	"Gudbuy T'Jane"	Holder, Lea	Slade on Stage	4:39
9.	"Mama Weer All Crazee Now"	Holder, Lea	Slade on Stage	2:55
10.	"You'll Never Walk Alone"	Rodgers and Hammerstein	Slade on Stage	0:35
11.	"When I'm Dancin' I Ain't Fightin'"	Holder, Lea	Alive at Reading (E.P.)	3:58
12.	"Born to Be Wild"	Bonfire	Alive at Reading (E.P.)	2:58
13.	"Somethin' Else, Pistol Packin' Mama, Keep a Rollin'"	Eddie Cochran, Sharon Sheeley, Al Dexter, Slade	Alive at Reading (E.P.)	6:15
14.	"Merry Xmas Everybody"	Holder, Lea	Xmas Ear Bender (E.P.)	0:39
15.	"Okey Cokey"	Jimmy Kennedy	Xmas Ear Bender (E.P.)	3:24
16.	"Get Down and Get With It"	Marchan	Xmas Ear Bender (E.P.)	6:48

== Chart performance ==
Chart (2006)	Peak position
Belgian Albums Chart	100
UK Albums Chart	191

== Personnel ==
Slade

- Noddy Holder - lead vocals, rhythm guitar
- Dave Hill - lead guitar, backing vocals
- Jim Lea - bass, backing vocals
- Don Powell - drums

Additional personnel

- Chas Chandler - producer of Slade Alive! and Slade Alive, Vol. 2
- Slade - producers of Slade on Stage, Alive at Reading and Xmas Ear Bender
