= List of UK singles chart number ones of the 1970s =

The UK singles chart is the official record chart in the United Kingdom. In the 1970s, it was compiled weekly by the British Market Research Bureau (BMRB) on behalf of the British record industry with a one-week break each Christmas. Prior to 1969 many music papers compiled their own sales charts but, on 15 February 1969, the BMRB was commissioned in a joint venture by the BBC and Record Retailer to compile the chart. BMRB compiled the first chart from postal returns of sales logs from 250 record shops. The sampling cost approximately £52,000 and shops were randomly chosen and submitted figures for sales taken up to the close of trade on Saturday. The data was compiled on Monday and given to the BBC on Tuesday to be announced on Johnnie Walker's afternoon show and later published in Record Retailer (rebranded Music Week in 1972). However, the BMRB often struggled to have the full sample of sales figures returned by post. The 1971 postal strike meant that data had to be collected by telephone but this was deemed inadequate for a national chart, and by 1973 the BMRB was using motorcycle couriers to collect sales figures.

In terms of number-one singles, ABBA were the most successful group of the decade having seven singles reach the top spot. The longest duration of a single at number-one was nine weeks and this was achieved on three occasions: "Bohemian Rhapsody" by Queen in 1975; "Mull of Kintyre" / "Girls' School" by Wings in 1977 and "You're the One That I Want" by John Travolta and Olivia Newton-John in 1978. Thirteen records were released that sold over one-million copies within the decade and "Mull of Kintyre" also became the first ever single to sell over two-million copies. In doing so it became the best-ever selling single beating the benchmark set by The Beatles' song "She Loves You" in 1963. "Mull of Kintyre" was also the biggest selling song of the decade and was not surpassed in physical sales until 1984 when Band Aid released "Do They Know It's Christmas?".

In 1973, the British Phonographic Industry (BPI) was formed and they began certifying the sales of records at certain thresholds: "silver" (250,000 units), "gold" (500,000 units), and "platinum" (1,000,000 units). (Note: The number of sales required to qualify for platinum, gold and silver records was dropped in 1989 to the current thresholds of 200,000 units for a silver record, 400,000 units for a gold record and 600,000 units for a platinum record.) In 1977, the BPI held an awards ceremony at Wembley Conference Centre to mark the Silver Jubilee of Elizabeth II. The event cost £25,000, honoured music from the last 25 years and is considered to be the first Brit Awards ceremony.

== Number-one singles ==
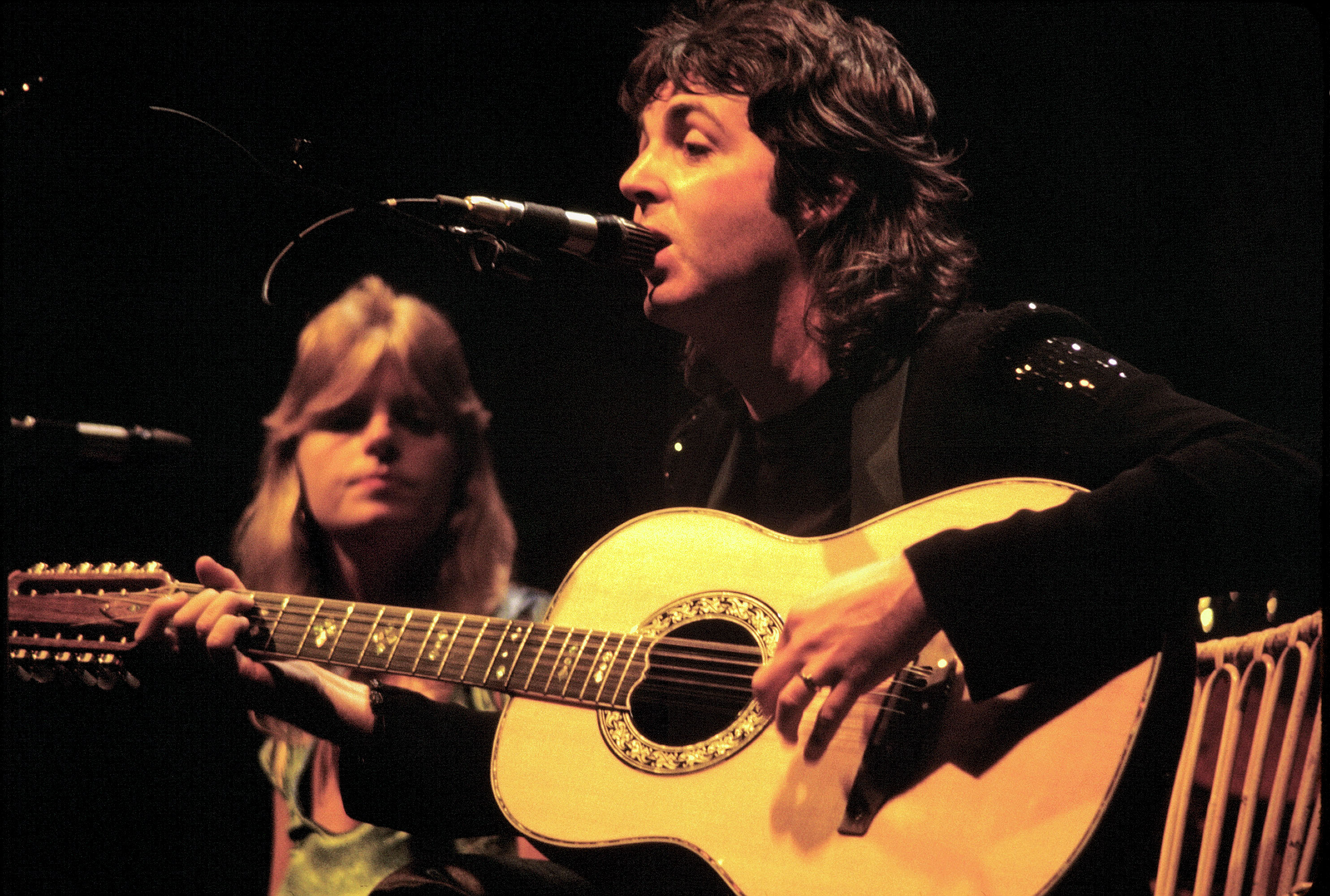
Paul McCartney with wife and Wings band member Linda. McCartney wrote the Wings song "Mull of Kintyre", which was the best-selling record of the decade.

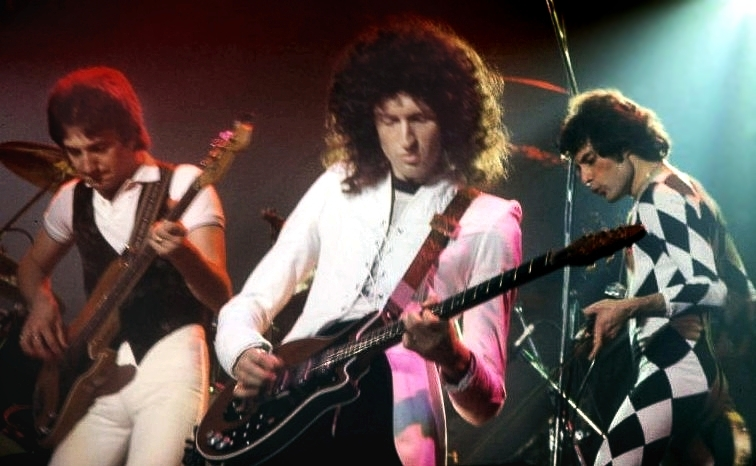
Queen, who spent nine weeks at number one with "Bohemian Rhapsody" in 1975

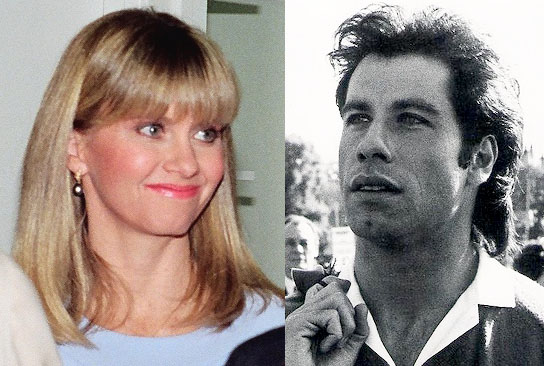
John Travolta and Olivia Newton-John, who had two number-one singles in 1978 and occupied the top spot for over a quarter of the year.

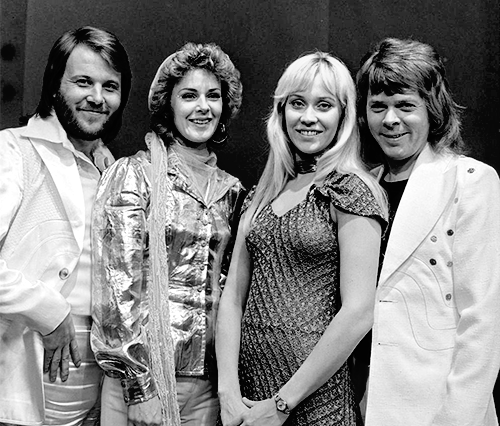
ABBA, who had 7 number-one singles in the 1970s, the most of any musical act during the decade

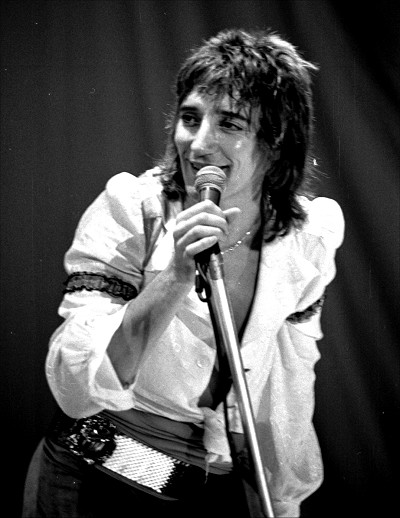
Rod Stewart, who had 5 number-one singles in the 1970s

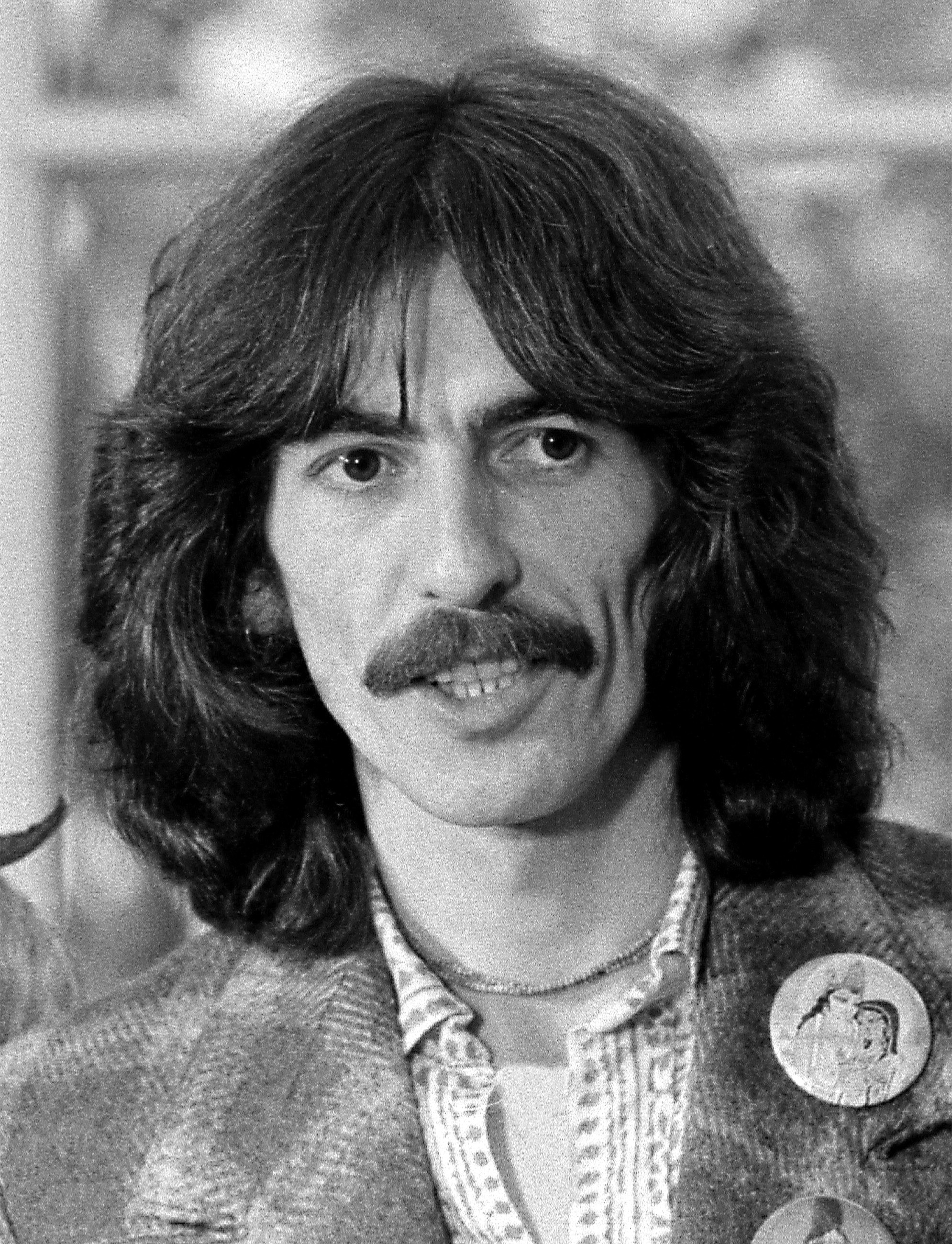
Former Beatles member George Harrison had the best-selling single of 1971.

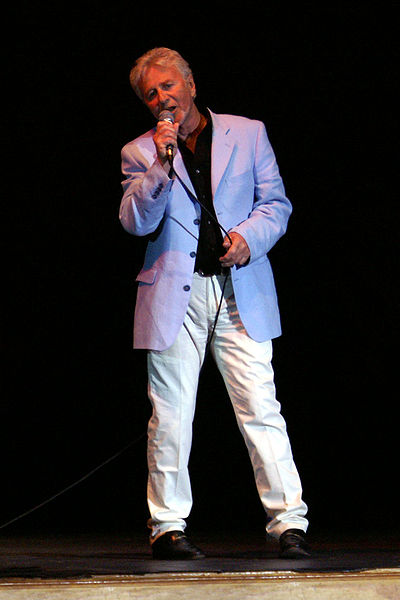
Tony Burrows, lead singer of Edison Lighthouse, who had the first new number-one single of the decade

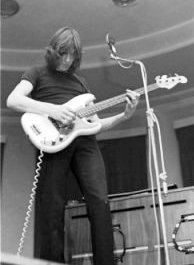
Pink Floyd bassist Roger Waters wrote Another Brick in the Wall, which was the last number-one single of the decade.

Key
†	Best-selling single of the year
‡	Best-selling single of the decade

No.	Artist (Note: The artist, song name, date of number one and its consecutive duration are those given by The Official Charts Company.)	Single	Record label (Note: The record labels are those given by the OCC.)	Week ending date	Weeks at number one
1970
280	Rolf Harris	"Two Little Boys"	Columbia	20 December 1969	6
281	Edison Lighthouse	"Love Grows (Where My Rosemary Goes)"	Bell	31 January 1970	5
282	Lee Marvin	"Wand'rin' Star"	Paramount	7 March 1970	3
283	Simon & Garfunkel	"Bridge over Troubled Water"	CBS	28 March 1970	3
284	Dana	"All Kinds of Everything"	Rex	18 April 1970	2
285	Norman Greenbaum	"Spirit in the Sky"	Reprise	2 May 1970	2
286	England World Cup Squad	"Back Home"	Pye	16 May 1970	3
287	Christie	"Yellow River"	CBS	6 June 1970	1
288	Mungo Jerry	"In the Summertime" † (Note: Until 2021, "The Wonder of You" was recognised as the best-selling single of 1970. However, the Official Charts Company compiled a new list using updated sales information, which instead placed "In the Summertime" at the top.)	Dawn	13 June 1970	7
289	Elvis Presley	"The Wonder of You"	RCA	1 August 1970	6
290	Smokey Robinson and the Miracles	"The Tears of a Clown"	Tamla Motown	12 September 1970	1
291	Freda Payne	"Band of Gold"	Invictus	19 September 1970	6
292	Matthews Southern Comfort	"Woodstock"	Uni	31 October 1970	3
293	The Jimi Hendrix Experience	"Voodoo Chile"	Track	21 November 1970	1
294	Dave Edmunds	"I Hear You Knocking"	MAM	28 November 1970	6
1971
295	Clive Dunn	"Grandad"	Columbia	9 January 1971	3
296	George Harrison	"My Sweet Lord" †	Apple	30 January 1971	5
297	Mungo Jerry	"Baby Jump"	Dawn	6 March 1971	2
298	T. Rex	"Hot Love"	Fly	20 March 1971	6
299	Dave and Ansell Collins	"Double Barrel"	Techniques	1 May 1971	2
300	Dawn	"Knock Three Times"	Bell	15 May 1971	5
301	Middle of the Road	"Chirpy Chirpy Cheep Cheep"	RCA	19 June 1971	5
302	T. Rex	"Get It On"	Fly	24 July 1971	4
303	Diana Ross	"I'm Still Waiting"	Tamla Motown	21 August 1971	4
304	The Tams	"Hey Girl Don't Bother Me"	Probe	18 September 1971	3
305	Rod Stewart	"Reason to Believe" / "Maggie May"	Mercury	9 October 1971	5
306	Slade	"Coz I Luv You"	Polydor	13 November 1971	4
307	Benny Hill	"Ernie (The Fastest Milkman in the West)"	Columbia	11 December 1971	4
1972
308	The New Seekers	"I'd Like to Teach the World to Sing (In Perfect Harmony)"	Polydor	8 January 1972	4
309	T. Rex	"Telegram Sam"	T. Rex	5 February 1972	2
310	Chicory Tip	"Son of My Father"	CBS	19 February 1972	3
311	Nilsson	"Without You"	RCA	11 March 1972	5
312	Royal Scots Dragoon Guards	"Amazing Grace" †	RCA	15 April 1972	5
313	T. Rex	"Metal Guru"	EMI	20 May 1972	4
314	Don McLean	"Vincent"	United Artists	17 June 1972	2
315	Slade	"Take Me Bak 'Ome"	Polydor	1 July 1972	1
316	Donny Osmond	"Puppy Love"	MGM	8 July 1972	5
317	Alice Cooper	"School's Out"	Warner Bros.	12 August 1972	3
318	Rod Stewart	"You Wear It Well"	Mercury	2 September 1972	1
319	Slade	"Mama Weer All Crazee Now"	Polydor	9 September 1972	3
320	David Cassidy	"How Can I Be Sure"	Bell	30 September 1972	2
321	Lieutenant Pigeon	"Mouldy Old Dough"	Decca	14 October 1972	4
322	Gilbert O'Sullivan	"Clair"	MAM	11 November 1972	2
323	Chuck Berry	"My Ding-a-Ling"	Chess	25 November 1972	4
324	Little Jimmy Osmond	"Long Haired Lover from Liverpool"	MGM	23 December 1972	5
1973
325	The Sweet	"Blockbuster!"	RCA	27 January 1973	5
326	Slade	"Cum On Feel the Noize"	Polydor	3 March 1973	4
327	Donny Osmond	"The Twelfth of Never"	MGM	31 March 1973	1
328	Gilbert O'Sullivan	"Get Down"	MAM	7 April 1973	2
329	Tony Orlando and Dawn	"Tie a Yellow Ribbon Round the Ole Oak Tree" †	Bell	21 April 1973	4
330	Wizzard	"See My Baby Jive"	Harvest	19 May 1973	4
331	Suzi Quatro	"Can the Can"	RAK	16 June 1973	1
332	10cc	"Rubber Bullets"	UK	23 June 1973	1
333	Slade	"Skweeze Me, Pleeze Me"	Polydor	30 June 1973	3
334	Peters and Lee	"Welcome Home"	Philips	21 July 1973	1
335	Gary Glitter	"I'm the Leader of the Gang (I Am)"	Bell	28 July 1973	4
336	Donny Osmond	"Young Love"	MGM	25 August 1973	4
337	Wizzard	"Angel Fingers"	Harvest	22 September 1973	1
338	Simon Park Orchestra	"Eye Level"	Columbia	29 September 1973	4
339	David Cassidy	"Daydreamer" / "The Puppy Song"	Bell	27 October 1973	3
340	Gary Glitter	"I Love You Love Me Love"	Bell	17 November 1973	4
341	Slade	"Merry Xmas Everybody"	Polydor	15 December 1973	5
1974
342	The New Seekers	"You Won't Find Another Fool Like Me"	Polydor	19 January 1974	1
343	Mud	"Tiger Feet" †	RAK	26 January 1974	4
344	Suzi Quatro	"Devil Gate Drive"	RAK	23 February 1974	2
345	Alvin Stardust	"Jealous Mind"	Magnet	9 March 1974	1
346	Paper Lace	"Billy Don't Be a Hero"	Bus Stop	16 March 1974	3
347	Terry Jacks	"Seasons in the Sun"	Bell	6 April 1974	4
348	ABBA	"Waterloo"	Epic	4 May 1974	2
349	The Rubettes	"Sugar Baby Love"	Polydor	18 May 1974	4
350	Ray Stevens	"The Streak"	Janus	15 June 1974	1
351	Gary Glitter	"Always Yours"	Bell	22 June 1974	1
352	Charles Aznavour	"She"	Barclay	29 June 1974	4
353	George McCrae	"Rock Your Baby"	Jay Boy	27 July 1974	3
354	The Three Degrees	"When Will I See You Again"	Philadelphia International	17 August 1974	2
355	The Osmonds	"Love Me for a Reason"	MGM	31 August 1974	3
356	Carl Douglas	"Kung Fu Fighting"	Pye	21 September 1974	3
357	John Denver	"Annie's Song"	RCA	12 October 1974	1
358	Sweet Sensation	"Sad Sweet Dreamer"	Pye	19 October 1974	1
359	Ken Boothe	"Everything I Own"	Trojan	26 October 1974	3
360	David Essex	"Gonna Make You a Star"	CBS	16 November 1974	3
361	Barry White	"You're the First, the Last, My Everything"	20th Century	7 December 1974	2
362	Mud	"Lonely This Christmas"	RAK	21 December 1974	4
1975
363	Status Quo	"Down Down"	Vertigo	18 January 1975	1
364	The Tymes	"Ms Grace"	RCA	25 January 1975	1
365	Pilot	"January"	EMI	1 February 1975	3
366	Steve Harley & Cockney Rebel	"Make Me Smile (Come Up and See Me)"	EMI	22 February 1975	2
367	Telly Savalas	"If"	MCA	8 March 1975	2
368	Bay City Rollers	"Bye Bye Baby" †	Bell	22 March 1975	6
369	Mud	"Oh Boy"	RAK	3 May 1975	2
370	Tammy Wynette	"Stand by Your Man"	Epic	17 May 1975	3
371	Windsor Davies and Don Estelle	"Whispering Grass"	EMI	7 June 1975	3
372	10cc	"I'm Not in Love"	Mercury	28 June 1975	2
373	Johnny Nash	"Tears on My Pillow"	CBS	12 July 1975	1
374	Bay City Rollers	"Give a Little Love"	Bell	19 July 1975	3
375	Typically Tropical	"Barbados"	Gull	9 August 1975	1
376	The Stylistics	"Can't Give You Anything (But My Love)"	Avco	16 August 1975	3
377	Rod Stewart	"Sailing"	Warner Bros.	6 September 1975	4
378	David Essex	"Hold Me Close"	CBS	4 October 1975	3
379	Art Garfunkel	"I Only Have Eyes for You"	CBS	25 October 1975	2
380	David Bowie	"Space Oddity"	RCA	8 November 1975	2
381	Billy Connolly	"D.I.V.O.R.C.E."	Polydor	22 November 1975	1
382	Queen	"Bohemian Rhapsody"	EMI	29 November 1975	9
1976
383	ABBA	"Mamma Mia"	Epic	31 January 1976	2
384	Slik	"Forever and Ever"	Bell	14 February 1976	1
385	The Four Seasons	"December, 1963 (Oh, What a Night)"	Warner Bros.	21 February 1976	2
386	Tina Charles	"I Love to Love (But My Baby Loves to Dance)"	CBS	6 March 1976	3
387	Brotherhood of Man	"Save Your Kisses for Me" †	Pye	27 March 1976	6
388	ABBA	"Fernando"	Epic	8 May 1976	4
389	J. J. Barrie	"No Charge"	Power Exchange	5 June 1976	1
390	The Wurzels	"Combine Harvester"	EMI	12 June 1976	2
391	The Real Thing	"You to Me Are Everything"	Pye	26 June 1976	3
392	Demis Roussos	The Roussos Phenomenon (EP)	Philips	17 July 1976	1
393	Elton John and Kiki Dee	"Don't Go Breaking My Heart"	Rocket	24 July 1976	6
394	ABBA	"Dancing Queen"	Epic	4 September 1976	6
395	Pussycat	"Mississippi"	Sonet	16 October 1976	4
396	Chicago	"If You Leave Me Now"	CBS	13 November 1976	3
397	Showaddywaddy	"Under the Moon of Love"	Bell	4 December 1976	3
398	Johnny Mathis	"When a Child Is Born (Soleado)"	CBS	25 December 1976	3
1977
399	David Soul	"Don't Give Up on Us"	Private Stock	15 January 1977	4
400	Julie Covington	"Don't Cry for Me Argentina"	MCA	12 February 1977	1
401	Leo Sayer	"When I Need You"	Chrysalis	19 February 1977	3
402	The Manhattan Transfer	"Chanson D'Amour"	Atlantic	12 March 1977	3
403	ABBA	"Knowing Me, Knowing You"	Epic	2 April 1977	5
404	Deniece Williams	"Free"	CBS	7 May 1977	2
405	Rod Stewart	"I Don't Want to Talk About It" / "The First Cut Is the Deepest" (Note: A long debate has persisted about whether the Sex Pistols out-sold Sir Rod Stewart's double A-side (a budget single) in June 1977, with their anti-Monarchy anthem "God Save the Queen", during the week of Queen Elizabeth II's Silver Jubilee. On the official UK singles chart used by the BBC, it was placed at no. 2, and was banned by the national broadcaster and the Independent Broadcasting Authority, which regulated Independent Local Radio, as it was felt that it might cause offence. In more recent years, however, the BBC have tacitly admitted that the song did indeed reach the top of the chart, although this has never been definitively confirmed, with the BBC and sources close to Virgin Records' owner Richard Branson both confirming and denying it as fact.)	Riva	21 May 1977	4
406	Kenny Rogers	"Lucille"	United Artists	18 June 1977	1
407	The Jacksons	"Show You the Way to Go"	Epic	25 June 1977	1
408	Hot Chocolate	"So You Win Again"	RAK	2 July 1977	3
409	Donna Summer	"I Feel Love"	Casablanca	23 July 1977	4
410	Brotherhood of Man	"Angelo"	Pye	20 August 1977	1
411	The Floaters	"Float On"	ABC	27 August 1977	1
412	Elvis Presley	"Way Down"	RCA	3 September 1977	5
413	David Soul	"Silver Lady"	Private Stock	8 October 1977	3
414	Baccara	"Yes Sir, I Can Boogie"	RCA	29 October 1977	1
415	ABBA	"The Name of the Game"	Epic	5 November 1977	4
416	Wings	"Mull of Kintyre" / "Girls' School" ‡	Parlophone	3 December 1977	9
1978
417	Althea & Donna	"Uptown Top Ranking"	Lightning	4 February 1978	1
418	Brotherhood of Man	"Figaro"	Pye	11 February 1978	1
419	ABBA	"Take a Chance on Me"	Epic	18 February 1978	3
420	Kate Bush	"Wuthering Heights"	EMI	11 March 1978	4
421	Brian and Michael	"Matchstalk Men & Matchstalk Cats & Dogs"	Pye	8 April 1978	3
422	Bee Gees	"Night Fever"	RSO	29 April 1978	2
423	Boney M.	"Rivers of Babylon" / "Brown Girl in the Ring" †	Atlantic/Hansa	13 May 1978	5
424	John Travolta and Olivia Newton-John	"You're the One That I Want"	RSO	17 June 1978	9
425	Commodores	"Three Times a Lady"	Motown	19 August 1978	5
426	10cc	"Dreadlock Holiday"	Mercury	23 September 1978	1
427	John Travolta and Olivia Newton-John	"Summer Nights"	RSO	30 September 1978	7
428	The Boomtown Rats	"Rat Trap"	Ensign	18 November 1978	2
429	Rod Stewart	"Da Ya Think I'm Sexy?"	Riva	2 December 1978	1
430	Boney M.	"Mary's Boy Child – Oh My Lord"	Atlantic/Hansa	9 December 1978	4
1979
431	Village People	"Y.M.C.A."	Mercury	6 January 1979	3
432	Ian Dury and the Blockheads	"Hit Me with Your Rhythm Stick"	Stiff	27 January 1979	1
433	Blondie	"Heart of Glass"	Chrysalis	3 February 1979	4
434	Bee Gees	"Tragedy"	RSO	3 March 1979	2
435	Gloria Gaynor	"I Will Survive"	Polydor	17 March 1979	4
436	Art Garfunkel	"Bright Eyes" †	CBS	14 April 1979	6
437	Blondie	"Sunday Girl"	Chrysalis	26 May 1979	3
438	Anita Ward	"Ring My Bell"	TK	16 June 1979	2
439	Tubeway Army	"Are 'Friends' Electric?"	Beggars Banquet	30 June 1979	4
440	The Boomtown Rats	"I Don't Like Mondays"	Ensign	28 July 1979	4
441	Cliff Richard	"We Don't Talk Anymore"	EMI	25 August 1979	4
442	Gary Numan	"Cars"	Beggars Banquet	22 September 1979	1
443	The Police	"Message in a Bottle"	A&M	29 September 1979	3
444	The Buggles	"Video Killed the Radio Star"	Island	20 October 1979	1
445	Lena Martell	"One Day at a Time"	Pye	27 October 1979	3
446	Dr. Hook	"When You're in Love with a Beautiful Woman"	Capitol	17 November 1979	3
447	The Police	"Walking on the Moon"	A&M	8 December 1979	1
448	Pink Floyd	"Another Brick in the Wall (Part II)"	Harvest	15 December 1979	5

== By artist ==
The following artists achieved three or more number-one hits during the 1970s. Swedish group ABBA were the most successful artist of the decade in terms of number-one singles; they had seven number-ones: "Waterloo" (1974); "Mamma Mia", "Fernando" and "Dancing Queen" (all 1976); "Knowing Me, Knowing You", "The Name of the Game" (both 1977); and "Take a Chance on Me" (1978). Art Garfunkel also had three number-one hits, two as a solo artist and one as part of the duo Simon & Garfunkel.

Artist	Number ones	Weeks at number one
ABBA	7	26
Slade	6	20
Rod Stewart	5	15
T. Rex	4	16
Donny Osmond	3	10
Mud	3	10
Gary Glitter	3	9
Brotherhood of Man	3	8
10cc	3	4

== By record label ==
The following record labels had five or more number ones on the UK singles chart during the 1970s.

Record label	Number ones
Bell	13
CBS	12
Polydor	11
RCA	10
Pye	9
Epic	9
EMI	8
RAK	6
MGM	5

== Million-selling and platinum records ==
In April 1973, the British Phonographic Industry began classifying singles and albums by the number of units sold. The highest threshold is "platinum record" and was then awarded to singles that sold over 1,000,000 units. Thirteen records were classified platinum in the 1970s and two number-one songs from the 1970s were classified as platinum in the subsequent decade. Slade's "Merry Xmas Everybody" subsequently sold over one-million copies but in 1985, after sales from its re-release were included.

Two other songs originally released in the 1970s became platinum and become million selling records but both were number-ones in a subsequent decade after being re-released: "Imagine" by John Lennon charted at number six in 1975 but reached number one in 1981 following Lennon's death at the end of the previous year and Tony Christie's "(Is This The Way To) Amarillo" reached number eighteen in 1971 but later took top spot after being re-released as a charity single in 2005. Five number-ones – ABBA's "Dancing Queen", Ian Dury and The Blockheads' "Hit Me with Your Rhythm Stick", The New Seekers' "I'd Like to Teach the World to Sing (In Perfect Harmony)", Julie Covington's "Don't Cry for Me Argentina" and Pink Floyd's "Another Brick in the Wall (Part II)" – passed the million-sales mark following the introduction of music downloads in 2004.

Artist	Song	Date released	Date certified platinum	Year of millionth sale
Gary Glitter	"I Love You Love Me Love"	9 November 1973	1 January 1974	1973
Brotherhood of Man	"Save Your Kisses for Me"	5 March 1976	1 May 1976	1976
Queen	"Bohemian Rhapsody"	31 October 1975	1 January 1976	1975
Wings	"Mull of Kintyre"	11 November 1977	1 December 1977	1977
David Soul	"Don't Give Up on Us"	3 December 1976	1 February 1977	1977
Boney M.	"Rivers of Babylon" / "Brown Girl in the Ring"	14 April 1978	1 May 1978	1978
Boney M.	"Mary's Boy Child – Oh My Lord"	24 November 1978	1 December 1978	1978
Simon Park	"Eye Level"	3 November 1972	1 January 1978	1977
John Travolta and Olivia Newton-John	"You're the One That I Want"	1 May 1978	1 July 1978	1978
John Travolta and Olivia Newton-John	"Summer Nights"	1 September 1978	1 October 1978	1978
Village People	"Y.M.C.A."	1 November 1978	1 January 1979	1979
Blondie	"Heart of Glass	19 January 1979	1 February 1979	1979
Art Garfunkel	"Bright Eyes"	9 January 1979	1 May 1979	1979
Pink Floyd	"Another Brick in the Wall (Part II)"	23 November 1979	1 January 1980	2004–10
Slade	"Merry Xmas Everybody"	7 December 1973	1 December 1980	1985
The New Seekers	"I'd Like to Teach the World to Sing (In Perfect Harmony)"	11 December 1971	—	2004–10
ABBA	"Dancing Queen"	6 August 1976	—	2004–10
Julie Covington	"Don't Cry for Me Argentina"	12 November 1976	—	2004–10
Ian Dury and The Blockheads	"Hit Me with Your Rhythm Stick"	1 November 1978	—	2004–10

== Songs with the most weeks at number one ==
The following songs spent at least six weeks at number one during the 1970s.

Artist	Song	Weeks at number one
Queen	"Bohemian Rhapsody"	9
Wings	"Mull of Kintyre" / "Girls' School'	9
Olivia Newton-John and John Travolta	"You're the One That I Want"	9
Mungo Jerry	"In the Summertime"	7
Olivia Newton-John and John Travolta	"Summer Nights"	7
Elvis Presley	"The Wonder of You"	6
Freda Payne	"Band of Gold"	6
Dave Edmunds	"I Hear You Knocking	6
T. Rex	"Hot Love"	6
Bay City Rollers	"Bye Bye Baby"	6
Brotherhood of Man	"Save Your Kisses for Me"	6
Elton John and Kiki Dee	"Don't Go Breaking My Heart"	6
ABBA	"Dancing Queen"	6
Art Garfunkel	"Bright Eyes"	6
