= Slade Alive! =

Live album by Slade
- Released: 24 March 1972
- Recorded: 19–21 October 1971
- Venues: Command Studios, 201 Piccadilly, London W1
- Genres: Hard rock; protopunk
- Length: 39:00
- Label: Polydor (UK/US)
- Producer: Chas Chandler

Slade chronology
| Coz I Luv You (1972) | Slade Alive! (1972) | Slayed? (1972) |

Slade Alive! is the first live album by the British rock band Slade. The album was released on 24 March 1972 and reached No. 2 on the UK Albums Chart, remaining in the chart for 58 weeks. It was Slade's first album to enter the UK charts and the first to enter the Billboard 200 in the United States, where it reached No. 158. The album was produced by Chas Chandler.

Slade Alive! contains three original songs, plus cover versions of songs by Ten Years After, The Lovin' Spoonful, Bobby Marchan, and Steppenwolf. It was recorded live at Command Theatre Studio and mixed at Olympic Studios.

Today, the album has been considered one of the greatest live albums of all time. Kiss, who were heavily influenced by Slade, would title their 1975 live album Alive! as a homage to Slade Alive!.

== Background ==
Having made their UK breakthrough with the hits "Get Down and Get With It", "Coz I Luv You" and "Look Wot You Dun", Slade decided that the best way to break into the album charts would be to capture their live sound on record. In October 1971, the band played three consecutive nights at London's Command Theatre Studio in front of an audience. The three nights cost £600 to record.

"Our manager, Chas Chandler, had come up with the idea of us doing a live album, because he'd been Jimi Hendrix's manager and he'd seen how some of Hendrix's live performances had been turning points in his career. So we booked a little studio-cum-theatre on Piccadilly for three nights: the Tuesday, Wednesday and Thursday. The bulk of the album was from the Wednesday night, which was mayhem. 'Coz I Luv You' was number one, and we'd come straight from doing Top of the Pops. We were still wearing our clobber from the telly, and we went pretty much straight onstage… Our aim onstage was to hit the crowd between the eyes and grab them by the balls." – Noddy Holder

Initially Chandler rejected Command Studio's mix of the album, which was completed in conjunction with the band. He remixed the tapes himself, but the band rejected that version and went back to their own original mix. Prior to the album's release, "Hear Me Calling" was released as a promotional single in February 1972, with "Get Down With It" as the B-Side. The release was limited to 500 copies.

Issued in March 1972, Slade Alive! reached number two in the UK. In Australia, it reached No. 1 and was the biggest-selling album since The Beatles' Sgt. Pepper's Lonely Hearts Club Band (1967).

== Release ==
In its original LP vinyl format, the album was issued in a gatefold sleeve which revealed a huge cartoon drawing on the inside. This drawing was the winning entry in a competition run in The Sun newspaper to design the album cover. In Israel, Italy, and certain editions in the Netherlands and France, the front cover used the inner gatefold artwork instead.

In 1978, the album was given a German release as a double-pack LP with a gatefold sleeve, paired with the Slade Alive, Vol. 2. It received its first CD release in 1991, which was digitally remastered by Lea. In 2006, it was included as part of the Salvo two-disc live compilation Slade Alive! – The Live Anthology. Salvo re-issued it on vinyl in 2009 and on CD in 2011. In 2017, BMG released a deluxe edition to celebrate its 45th anniversary. It was issued on vinyl with a 6-page insert and art card, and on CD with a 28-page booklet. In December 2021, BMG reissued the album on splatter vinyl.

== Promotion ==
As a major part of promotion for the album, the band did a UK tour in May.

On the UK Granada Television, the band performed a 'Set of Six' show on 13 June 1972. This filmed set featured a similar set to Slade Alive!, the tracks in order being "Hear Me Calling", "Look Wot You Dun", "Darling Be Home Soon", "Coz I Luv You", "Get Down and Get With It" and "Born To Be Wild".

== Song information ==
"Hear Me Calling", a cover of the 1969 song by Ten Years After, was originally planned as Slade's follow-up single to their 1971 breakthrough hit "Get Down and Get With It". However, the band could not better the song in the studio and the idea was dropped. In 2011, the vinyl acetate containing the studio version appeared as a bonus track on the 2011 Salvo remaster of Sladest. In a 1981 interview, drummer Don Powell said of "In Like a Shot from My Gun": "It was originally meant to be put down in the studio. But after we recorded it for Slade Alive!, we didn't think that we could do it any more justice by doing it in the studio - as it's basically a live number."

"Darling Be Home Soon", a cover of the 1967 song by The Lovin' Spoonful, notably features Holder burping into the microphone. In 2000, he admitted on The Frank Skinner Show that the burp was accidental as the band had a lot to drink before performing, and that from then on he continued to do the burp whenever the song was performed as audiences were left "disappointed" otherwise. "Know Who You Are" is an original song which originally appeared on the band's 1970 album Play It Loud. "Get Down With It" is a cover of the 1965 Bobby Marchan song. Aside from being Slade's breakthrough hit, it was regularly featured as part of the band's live set for the band's entire live career. "Born to be Wild", a cover of the 1968 song by Steppenwolf, was originally recorded in the studio by Slade for their 1969 debut Beginnings.

== Critical reception ==
Professional ratings
Review scores
| Source | Rating |
|---|---|
| AllMusic | 4/5 stars |
| Christgau's Record Guide | B+ |

Upon release, Record Mirror felt the "rocking album" was a "good quality live recording". They added: "The excitement of the group and crowd has been captured well". New Musical Express said: "Slade Alive! is just what it implies. If you've ever been to one of their noisy gigs, you'll know exactly what I mean." The album would later be rated No. 2 in the magazine's Top 10 albums of 1972. Melody Maker commented: "Because it was recorded in a studio proper, before an audience, they've achieved the kind of balance and sound not often heard on a live recording."

Gregor Vaule of Colorado Springs Gazette-Telegraph felt the album "crammed" much of the band's "famous in-person excitement", adding: "The LP thunders in on Alvin Lee's "Hear Me Calling" and from that point on there is never a dull moment." Mike Diana of Daily Press Newport News described the album as a "real toe tapper", adding: "The boys play a frenetic kind of rock 'n' roll that features screaming lyrics, monosimple rhythms and buzzing guitars." Robert Hilburn of the Los Angeles Times commented on the band's "forceful, celebrative nature" and concluded: "As with any band worth its rock 'n' roll shoes, Slade Alive sounds better the louder you play it." Rich Aregood of the Philadelphia Daily News described the album as "eminently enjoyable", noting: "...Slade is something else again. A loud, rude, and exciting flatout rock-and-roll band that could even get Pat Nixon tapping her toe."

In 1991, Q described the album as "distinctly heavy" with a "laddish rock style". They concluded: "It's just fun and beers all the way." In 2010, Classic Rock considered the album "superior: reputation cementing". AllMusic commented: "Slade showed why they were one of England's best live acts with this fevered concert recording. Set alight by plenty of stomping beats, lumbering bass, fat guitars, and Noddy Holder's hoarse vocal scream, Slade Alive! finds the lads from Wolverhampton goading on their rabid fans at every juncture."

== Track listing ==
Side one
| No. | Title | Writer | Length |
|---|---|---|---|
| 1. | "Hear Me Calling" | Alvin Lee | 5:46 |
| 2. | "In Like a Shot from My Gun" | Noddy Holder, Jim Lea, Don Powell | 3:33 |
| 3. | "Darling Be Home Soon" | John Sebastian | 5:43 |
| 4. | "Know Who You Are" | Holder, Lea, Dave Hill, Powell | 3:37 |

Side two
| No. | Title | Writer | Length |
|---|---|---|---|
| 5. | "Keep on Rocking" | Holder, Lea, Hill, Powell | 6:29 |
| 6. | "Get Down and Get with It" | Bobby Marchan | 5:33 |
| 7. | "Born to Be Wild" | Mars Bonfire | 8:12 |

== Personnel ==
Slade

- Noddy Holder – lead vocals, rhythm guitar
- Dave Hill – lead guitar, backing vocals
- Jim Lea – bass, backing vocals
- Don Powell – drums

Additional personnel

- Chas Chandler – producer
- Barry Ainsworth – recording engineer
- Alan O'Duffy – mixing engineer
- Derek Robinson – artwork
- Chris Walter – photography (front)
- M. Webb – artwork (sleeve inner)
- Tambourine on "Know Who You Are" was played by an unknown member of the audience

== Charts ==
Weekly chart performance for Slade Alive!
| Chart (1972–1973) | Peak position |
|---|---|
| Australian Albums (Kent Music Report) | 1 |
| Austrian Albums (Ö3 Austria) | 8 |
| Canada Top Albums/CDs (RPM) | 77 |
| Finnish Albums (Suomen virallinen lista) | 5 |
| German Albums (Offizielle Top 100) | 25 |
| Norwegian Albums (VG-lista) | 18 |
| UK Albums (Official Charts) | 2 |
| US Billboard 200 | 158 |
| US Cash Box Top Albums (101 to 165) | 105 |
| US Record World The Album Chart | 96 |
