= Sladest =

Compilation album by Slade
- Released: 28 September 1973
- Genres: Glam rock, hard rock
- Length: 45:47
- Labels: Polydor (UK), Reprise (US)
- Producer: Chas Chandler

Slade chronology
Slayed? (1972)	Sladest (1973)	Old, New, Borrowed and Blue (1974)

Sladest is a compilation album by the British rock band Slade. It was released by Polydor on 28 September 1973 and was certified UK Silver by BPI that month. It remained in the charts for 24 weeks. The album was certified UK Gold by BPI in November 1973. In America, Sladest was released by Reprise and featured a significantly different track listing. It reached No. 129 on the Billboard 200.

== Background ==
In 1973, Slade were one of the most popular bands in Britain, having achieved two number one singles – "Cum On Feel the Noize" and "Skweeze Me, Pleeze Me" – in three months. Both had entered the charts straight at number one, which was a rare feat at the time and had not been achieved since the Beatles with "Get Back" in 1969. However, soon after the release of "Skweeze Me, Pleeze Me", drummer Don Powell was involved in a near fatal car crash in July 1973. The accident threw the band's future into doubt and despite his critical condition, Powell was able to make a recovery.

While recording their next studio album, Old New Borrowed and Blue, Slade decided to release a compilation album to maintain the band's momentum. Sladest was released in September 1973, on the same day as the band's new single "My Friend Stan". Sladest topped the UK charts and was a success in Europe and beyond too. In its first week of release, it was awarded a UK Silver Disc and in November, it received a UK Gold Disc and was set to surpass 200,000 sales at the time. Having remained at No. 1 for its first three weeks of release, Sladest later returned to the top spot in mid-January 1974, following the success of "Merry Xmas Everybody".

== Release ==
Sladest was originally going to be titled "The Best of Slade". It contained fourteen tracks and included the band's eight hit singles up to that time, along with six other tracks, five of which pre-dated Slade's commercial breakthrough in 1971. In America, the album was released by Reprise (Warner Bros. Records), and was the band's first release on the label. The release featured ten tracks, including the band's eight hit singles, along with "My Friend Stan" and its B-Side "My Town".

Sladest was first released on CD in Japan in 1988. A UK and European CD release followed in 1993. In 2011, the album was remastered and re-issued on CD by Salvo. It included four extra tracks, one of which was a previously unreleased studio version of "Hear Me Calling".

== Critical reception ==
Professional ratings
Review scores
Source	Rating
AllMusic	4/5 stars
Christgau's Record Guide	B+
Record Collector	4/5 stars

Upon release in America, Ken Barnes of Rolling Stone described the album as a "comprehensive collection", providing an "unimprovable perspective on their past successes, as well as some of the wildest all-stops-out rock & roll you'll ever hear". He summarised the album as being "the best rocking album of the year". Robert Christgau felt that although Slayed? was "less tuneful", he preferred the album to Sladest, which contained material which saw "these Anglopop phenoms [turning] into raving maniacs". Billboard felt the album was an "extremely smart maneuver", serving the "dual purpose of introducing them as a singles band as well as giving them an almost fresh start with the American listening public".

In a retrospective review, Paul Tinelli of AllMusic believed the album contained "all of the material that helped the band sell tons of records and fill arenas in the U.K. in the early '70s." He felt that the material straying from their "successful formula of catchy guitar riffs and big choruses tend to fall flat". In 2003, Spin included the album in their "Essential Glam Rock" guide. They noted the material's "wind-tunnel guitar and choruses even the most lager-headed yob could chant", adding "the stadium-stomp anthems collected here run the gamut from dumb to dumberer."

== Track listing ==
Side one
No.	Title	Writer(s)	Length
1.	"Cum On Feel the Noize"	Noddy Holder, Jim Lea	4:29
2.	"Look Wot You Dun"	Holder, Lea, Don Powell	2:57
3.	"Gudbuy T'Jane"	Holder, Lea	3:31
4.	"One Way Hotel"	Holder, Lea, Powell	2:39
5.	"Skweeze Me, Pleeze Me"	Holder, Lea	4:35
6.	"Pouk Hill"	Holder, Lea, Powell	2:24
7.	"The Shape of Things to Come"	Barry Mann, Cynthia Weil	2:17

Side two
No.	Title	Writer(s)	Length
8.	"Take Me Bak 'Ome"	Holder, Lea	3:13
9.	"Coz I Luv You"	Holder, Lea	3:24
10.	"Wild Winds Are Blowing"	Bob Saker, Jack Winsley	2:38
11.	"Know Who You Are"	Dave Hill, Holder, Lea, Powell	2:53
12.	"Get Down and Get with It"	Bobby Marchan	3:48
13.	"Look at Last Nite"	Holder, Lea	3:05
14.	"Mama Weer All Crazee Now"	Holder, Lea	3:44

=== Bonus tracks on the 2011 Salvo remaster ===
No.	Title	Writer(s)	Length
15.	"Hear Me Calling" (studio version)	Alvin Lee	2:45
16.	"My Friend Stan"	Holder, Lea	2:41
17.	"My Town"	Holder, Lea	3:06
18.	"Kill 'Em at the Hot Club Tonite"	Holder, Lea	3:20

=== US track listing ===
No.	Title	Length
1.	"Cum On Feel the Noize"	4:30
2.	"Look Wot You Dun"	2:57
3.	"Gudbuy T'Jane"	3:31
4.	"My Friend Stan"	2:40
5.	"Skweeze Me, Pleeze Me"	2:35
6.	"Take Me Bak 'Ome"	3:15
7.	"Coz I Luv You"	3:24
8.	"My Town"	3:05
9.	"Get Down and Get with It"	3:48
10.	"Mama Weer All Crazee Now"	3:42

== Personnel ==
Slade

- Noddy Holder – lead vocals, rhythm guitar
- Dave Hill – lead guitar, backing vocals
- Jim Lea – bass, piano, violin, backing vocals
- Don Powell – drums

Additional personnel

- Chas Chandler – producer
- Bob Houston – liner notes
- Gered Mankowitz – photography

== Charts ==
=== Weekly charts ===
Weekly chart performance for Sladest
Chart (1973)	Peak position
Australian Albums (Kent Music Report)	3
Austrian Albums (Ö3 Austria)	10
Canada Top Albums/CDs (RPM)	75
Finnish Albums (Suomen virallinen lista)	1
German Albums (Offizielle Top 100)	3
Norwegian Albums (VG-lista)	4
UK Albums (Official Charts)	1
US Billboard 200	129
US Cashbox Top Albums (101 to 175)	112

Chart (1973)	Peak position
Scottish Albums (Official Charts)	55
UK Independent Albums (Official Charts)	15

=== Year-end charts ===
Year-end chart performance for Sladest
Chart (1974)	Position
German Albums (Offizielle Top 100)	35

== Certifications ==
Region	Certification	Certified units/sales
United Kingdom (BPI)	Gold	100,000^{^}
^{^} Shipments figures based on certification alone.
