= B-Sides (Slade album) =

Compilation album by Slade
- Released: 5 March 2007
- Genre: Glam rock, Hard rock
- Label: Salvo

Slade chronology
The Slade Box (2006)	B-Sides (2007)	Rockers (2007)

B-Sides is a 2-disc compilation album by the British glam rock band Slade released in March 2007. This was the first time many of the songs included on the album were released since the early 1970s.

Since the late 1980s, the Slade fan club had confirmed that a possible project was the release of a b-side compilation although this never materialised.

Digital masters were supplied for a number of the earlier B-sides by Ian Edmundson, who is credited in the CD booklet. Some needles drops were used from copies of rare singles supplied to Salvo by fans.

A number of B-Side tracks were excluded from this collection, as Salvo did not want to create a 3CD package. The tracks appear elsewhere as album tracks or bonus tracks on other Slade remasters by Salvo:

- "Good Time Gals" (B-Side of the single "Everyday")
- "Dizzy Mama" (B-Side to the single "Ginny Ginny")
- "My Baby's Got It" (B-Side to the single "Okey Cokey")
- "Hold onto Your Hats" (B-Side to the single "We'll Bring the House Down")
- "I'm Mad" (B-Side to the single "Knuckle Sandwich Nancy")
- "Merry Xmas Everybody – Live and Kickin'" (B-Side to the single "(And Now the Waltz) C'est La Vie")
- "We'll Bring the House Down – Live Version" (B-Side to the single "7 Year Bitch")
- "Santa Claus is Coming to Town" / "Auld Lang Syne/You'll Never Walk Alone" (B-Sides to the single "Do You Believe in Miracles?")
- "My Oh My – Piano and Vocal Demo" (B-Side to the single "Myzsterious Mizster Jones")
- "The Roaring Silence" (B-Side to the single "Still the Same")

== Track listing ==
Disc 1 – 1969–1977
No.	Title	Writer(s)	B-side of:	Length
1.	"One Way Hotel"	Noddy Holder, Jim Lea, Don Powell	"Wild Winds Are Blowing"	2:40
2.	"C’mon C’mon"	Holder, Lea	"The Shape of Things To Come"	2:42
3.	"Do You Want Me"	Dave Hill, Holder	"Get Down and Get With It"	4:42
4.	"Gospel According To Rasputin"	Hill, Holder	"Get Down And Get With It"	4:22
5.	"My Life Is Natural"	Holder	"Coz I Luv You"	3:17
6.	"Candidate"	Lea, Powell	"Look Wot You Dun"	2:52
7.	"Wonderin' Y"	Lea, Powell	"Take Me Bak 'Ome"	2:50
8.	"Man Who Speeks Evil"	Lea, Powell	"Mama Weer All Crazee Now"	3:17
9.	"I Won’t Let it 'Appen Agen"	Lea	"Gudbuy T'Jane"	3:16
10.	"I’m Mee I’m Now And That's Orl"	Holder, Lea	"Cum On Feel the Noize"	3:41
11.	"Kill 'Em at the Hot Club Tonite"	Holder, Lea	"Skweeze Me Pleeze Me"	3:20
12.	"My Town"	Holder, Lea	"My Friend Stan"	3:07
13.	"Don’t Blame Me"	Holder, Lea	"Merry Xmas Everybody"	2:33
14.	"She Did It To Me"	Holder, Lea	"The Bangin' Man"	3:19
15.	"O.K. Yesterday Was Yesterday"	Holder, Lea	"Far Far Away"	3:59
16.	"So Far So Good"	Holder, Lea	"How Does It Feel"	3:02
17.	"Raining in My Champagne"	Holder, Lea	"Thanks for the Memory"	4:12
18.	"Can You Just Imagine?"	Holder, Lea	"In For a Penny"	3:32
19.	"When The Chips Are Down"	Holder, Lea	"Let's Call It Quits"	4:15
20.	"L.A. Jinx"	Holder, Lea	"Nobody's Fool"	3:58
21.	"Forest Full of Needles"	Holder, Lea	"Gypsy Roadhog"	3:30

Disc 2 – 1977–1991
No.	Title	Writer(s)	B-side of…	Length
1.	"Ready Steady Kids"	Holder, Lea	"Burning in the Heat of Love"	3:22
2.	"O.H.M.S."	Holder, Lea	"My Baby Left Me – That's All Right"	2:42
3.	"Daddio"	Holder, Lea	"Give Us a Goal"	2:34
4.	"It's Alright Buy Me"	Holder, Lea	"Rock 'n' Roll Bolero"	3:23
5.	"Not Tonight Josephine"	Holder, Lea	"Sign of the Times"	3:03
6.	"Funk Punk & Junk"	Holder, Lea	"Ruby Red"	2:57
7.	"Keep Your Hands Off My Power Supply"	Holder, Lea	"My Oh My"	3:34
8.	"Don’t Tame A Hurricane"	Holder, Lea	"My Oh My"	2:33
9.	"Two Track Stereo One Track Mind"	Holder, Lea	"Run Runaway"	2:55
10.	"Here's to the New Year"	Holder, Lea	"All Join Hands"	3:10
11.	"Leave Them Girls Alone"	Holder, Lea	"7 Year Bitch"	3:14
12.	"Mama Nature is a Rocker"	Holder, Lea	"Myzsterious Mizster Jones"	2:52
13.	"My Oh My (Swing Version)"	Holder, Lea	"Do You Believe in Miracles"	3:02
14.	"Gotta Go Home"	Holder, Lea	"Still the Same"	3:20
15.	"Don’t Talk To Me About Love"	Holder, Lea	"Still the Same"	2:28
16.	"Wild Wild Party"	Holder, Lea	"That's What Friends Are For"	2:55
17.	"You Boyz Make Big Noize (Instrumental)"	Holder, Lea	"You Boyz Make Big Noize"	3:01
18.	"Lay Your Love on the Line"	Hill, Bill Hunt	"Radio Wall of Sound"	3:09
19.	"Red Hot"	Hill, Hunt	"Universe"	3:34

== Critical reception ==
Professional ratings
Review scores
Source	Rating
AllMusic	4/5 stars
Record Collector	4/5 stars

Dave Thompson of AllMusic wrote: "From the outset, the band was almost religious about ensuring there was more to every single than simply an advertisement for the next LP, and so such deathless classics piled up, each one as vital as the smash hit that lurked on the other side of the wax, and almost all of them destined to lie in obscurity for three decades. Neither does the quality dip too far on the other side of the hit years. Disc two covers Slade's late '70s and 1980s, but still manages to serve up such jewels as "Forest Full of Needles," "Ready Steady Kids," and "OHMS." Indeed, it's only when the obvious filler starts – such as the "swing version" of "My Oh My," an instrumental race through "You Boyz Make Big Noize," and so forth – that one's attention really starts to drift. But that's three-quarters of the way through a 40-song compilation, and that's a long way to go when you're talking about B-sides." Colin Harper of Record Collector stated: "Slade's B-sides, from the 70s at least, represent a far more interesting band than the one which perfected the terrace-chant million-sellers on their flip. For those who love the eclecticism and versatility on the pre-fame Play It Loud, and the barnstorming power of Slade Alive!, the first dozen or so tracks on this hugely impressive collection are a virtual third album in that sequence."
