= Rockers (Slade album) =

Compilation album by Slade
- Released: 17 April 2007
- Genre: Rock
- Length: 128:46
- Label: Salvo

Slade chronology
B-Sides (2007)	Rockers (2007)	In for a Penny: Raves & Faves (2007)

Rockers is a two-disc compilation album by the British rock band Slade, released by Salvo in April 2007. It contains thirty-seven tracks spanning the band's career from 1969 to 1987 and is described as a collection of the band's "hardest-hitting tracks".

== Track listing ==
=== Disc one ===
No.	Title	Writer(s)	Length
1.	"Born to Be Wild"	Mars Bonfire	3:25
2.	"Could I"	Jimmy Griffin, Robb Royer	2:45
3.	"The Shape of Things to Come"	Barry Mann, Cynthia Weil	2:18
4.	"Get Down and Get with It (Live)"	Bobby Marchan	5:35
5.	"Move Over"	Janis Joplin	3:45
6.	"The Whole World's Goin' Crazee"	Holder	3:36
7.	"Look at Last Nite"	Holder, Lea	3:05
8.	"Let the Good Times Roll/Feel So Fine"	Leonard Lee	3:45
9.	"My Town"	Holder, Lea	3:07
10.	"We're Really Gonna Raise the Roof"	Holder, Lea	3:10
11.	"Don't Blame Me"	Holder, Lea	2:33
12.	"Good Time Gals"	Holder, Lea	3:33
13.	"Do We Still Do It"	Holder, Lea	3:02
14.	"Standin' on the Corner"	Holder, Lea	4:54
15.	"O.K. Yesterday was Yesterday"	Holder, Lea	3:58
16.	"Them Kinda Monkeys Can't Swing"	Holder, Lea	3:27
17.	"Scratch My Back"	Holder, Lea	3:08
18.	"Be"	Holder, Lea	3:56
19.	"Burning in the Heat of Love"	Holder, Lea	3:37

=== Disc two ===
All tracks are written by Noddy Holder and Jim Lea except "I'm a Rocker" by Chuck Berry and "Let's Have a Party" by Cliff Friend, Joe Haynes and Phil Baxter.

No.	Title	Length
1.	"Wheels Ain't Coming Down"	3:37
2.	"Night Starvation"	3:06
3.	"I'm a Rocker"	2:42
4.	"Rock and Roll Preacher (Hallelujah I'm on Fire)"	5:46
5.	"Knuckle Sandwich Nancy"	3:15
6.	"Let the Rock Roll Out of Control"	4:02
7.	"Ruby Red"	2:55
8.	"Keep Your Hands Off My Power Supply"	3:34
9.	"Don't Tame a Hurricane"	2:33
10.	"Slam the Hammer Down"	3:26
11.	"Cocky Rock Boys (Rule O.K.)"	3:27
12.	"Myzsterious Mizster Jones"	3:36
13.	"Time to Rock"	4:10
14.	"Leave Them Girls Alone"	3:15
15.	"Let's Have a Party"	1:47
16.	"Hey Ho Wish You Well"	5:19
17.	"She's Heavy"	2:36
18.	"You Boyz Make Big Noize"	3:01

== Critical reception ==
Professional ratings
Review scores
Source	Rating
Get Ready to Rock!	3.5/5 stars

David Randall of the webzine Get Ready to Rock! wrote: "Rockers does exactly what it says on the tin and well annotated notes guide us through the band's growth. If short on subtlety, Rockers does flag up an excellent reissue series which reiterates Slade as one of our most colourful if under-estimated rock bands."

== Personnel ==
Slade

- Noddy Holder – lead vocals, rhythm guitar
- Dave Hill – lead guitar, backing vocals
- Jim Lea – bass, piano, violin, keyboard, guitar, backing vocals
- Don Powell – drums

Production

- Chas Chandler – tracks 2–19 (Disc One)
- John Punter – tracks 12, 16 (Disc Two)
- Slade – tracks 1 (Disc One), 1–9 (Disc Two)
- Roger Wake – tracks 1 (Disc One)
- Jim Lea – tracks 10–11, 13–15, 17–18 (Disc Two)

Other

- Tim Turan – remastering
- Chris Ingham – liner notes
