= Coz I Luv You (album) =

Compilation album by Slade
- Released: 1972
- Genre: Rock
- Length: 37:05
- Label: Polydor (GER)
- Producer: Chas Chandler

Slade chronology
Play It Loud (1970)	Coz I Luv You (1972)	Slade Alive! (1972)

Coz I Luv You is a compilation album by the British rock band Slade. It was released in 1972 in certain European countries, Australia and Argentina. It was the band's first compilation album and reached No. 10 in the Netherlands.

Capitalising on the success of the band's 1971 commercial breakthrough with the singles "Get Down and Get with It", "Coz I Luv You" and "Look Wot You Dun", the compilation was quickly compiled and released by Polydor. Aside from the A-Sides, the compilation features a mix of B-Sides and album tracks from the band's 1970 album Play It Loud.

== Release ==
"Coz I Luv You" was released by Polydor in Germany, the Netherlands, Norway, Sweden, Argentina and Australia. In Argentina, it was released under the name Mira Lo Que Has Hecho, which translates to "Look What You Have Done". In the Netherlands, the compilation had a different track-listing to the other releases. It replaced "Angelina", "Candidate", "Look Wot You Dun" and "Could I" with "One Way Hotel", "Do You Want Me", "See Us Here" and "Know Who You Are".

In 1973, it was re-issued in Germany by Luxor Gold. It too had a revised track-listing, featuring "See Us Here", "One Way Hotel", "I Remember", "Pouk Hill" and "Dirty Joker" in place of "My Life is Natural", "Candidate", "Could I", "Gospel According to Rasputin" and "Get Down and Get with It". Another German re-issue followed in 1974, released by Karussell, but featuring the original 1972 track-listing. The compilation is now out-of-print and has never been released on CD.

== Track listing ==
No.	Title	Writer(s)	Length
1.	"Coz I Luv You"	Noddy Holder, Jim Lea	3:23
2.	"Dapple Rose"	Lea, Powell	3:25
3.	"My Life is Natural"	Holder	3:12
4.	"Angelina"	Neil Innes	2:45
5.	"Candidate"	Lea, Powell	2:50
6.	"Sweet Box"	Lea, Powell	3:20
7.	"Look Wot You Dun"	Holder, Lea, Powell	2:56
8.	"Could I"	Jimmy Griffin, Robb Royer	2:45
9.	"Raven"	Holder, Lea, Powell	2:30
10.	"Gospel According to Rasputin"	Holder, Dave Hill	4:20
11.	"The Shape of Things to Come"	Barry Mann, Cynthia Weil	2:15
12.	"Get Down and Get with It"	Bobby Marchan	3:45

=== Dutch edition ===
No.	Title	Writer(s)	Length
1.	"Coz I Luv You"		3:24
2.	"Dapple Rose"		3:25
3.	"Sweet Box"		3:20
4.	"Gospel According to Rasputin"		4:23
5.	"My Life is Natural"		3:12
6.	"The Shape of Things to Come"		2:15
7.	"Get Down and Get with It"		4:12
8.	"One Way Hotel"	Holder, Lea, Powell	2:35
9.	"Raven"		2:30
10.	"Do You Want Me"	Holder, Hill	4:30
11.	"See Us Here"	Holder, Lea, Powell	3:10
12.	"Know Who You Are"	Holder, Lea, Powell, Hill	2:50

=== 1973 German edition ===
No.	Title	Writer(s)	Length
1.	"Look Wot You Dun"		2:56
2.	"Raven"		2:30
3.	"See Us Here"		3:10
4.	"Dapple Rose"		3:25
5.	"One Way Hotel"		2:35
6.	"Angelina"		2:45
7.	"Coz I Luv You"		3:23
8.	"I Remember"	Lea, Powell	2:55
9.	"Pouk Hill"	Holder, Lea, Powell	2:23
10.	"The Shape of Things to Come"		2:15
11.	"Dirty Joker"	Lea, Powell	3:26
12.	"Sweet Box"		3:20

== Critical reception ==
Professional ratings
Review scores
Source	Rating
AllMusic	4/5 stars

In a retrospective review of the album, Dave Thompson of AllMusic stated: "...in truth, there was little for the compilers to work with beyond adding the A- and B-sides of the band's last three singles to half-a-dozen tracks culled from Play It Loud itself. But still it's a terrific compilation, with the album cuts certainly consistent with the majesty of the hits. Indeed, of all the myriad Slade compilations to have appeared over the decades since then, this - the earliest of them all - feels closer to a "real" album than any of them."

== Personnel ==
Slade

- Noddy Holder – lead vocals, rhythm guitar
- Dave Hill – lead guitar, backing vocals
- Jim Lea – bass, piano, violin, backing vocals
- Don Powell – drums

Additional personnel

- Chas Chandler – producer

== Charts ==
Chart (1971)	Peak position
Australian Albums (Kent Music Report)	29
Dutch Albums (Album Top 100)	10
