= In for a Penny: Raves & Faves =

Compilation album by Slade
- Released: 17 April 2007
- Genre: Rock
- Length: 48:49
- Label: Shout! Factory
- Producer: Chas Chandler

Slade chronology
Rockers (2007)	In for a Penny: Raves & Faves (2007)	Live at the BBC (2009)

In for a Penny: Raves & Faves is a compilation album by the British rock band Slade, released in America only by Shout! Factory in April 2007. It was the second Slade compilation to be released in America since Shout! Factory's 2004 release Get Yer Boots On: The Best of Slade. The compilation features fifteen tracks, covering the band's career from 1970 to 1977. It includes album tracks, B-sides and singles that were hits in the UK and Europe.

== Track listing ==
No.	Title	Writer(s)	Length
1.	"The Shape of Things to Come"	Barry Mann, Cynthia Weil	2:20
2.	"C'mon C'mon"	Noddy Holder	2:37
3.	"Sweet Box"	Jim Lea, Don Powell	3:25
4.	"In Like a Shot from My Gun"	Holder, Lea, Powell	3:09
5.	"Wonderin' Y"	Lea, Powell	2:50
6.	"How d'You Ride"	Holder, Lea	3:14
7.	"Move Over"	Janis Joplin	3:44
8.	"Don't Blame Me"	Holder, Lea	2:34
9.	"Do We Still Do It"	Holder, Lea	3:04
10.	"When the Lights Are Out"	Holder, Lea	3:05
11.	"Them Kinda Monkeys Can't Swing"	Holder, Lea	3:28
12.	"Thanks for the Memory (Wham Bam Thank You Mam)"	Holder, Lea	4:34
13.	"In for a Penny"	Holder, Lea	3:37
14.	"Let's Call It Quits"	Holder, Lea	3:30
15.	"Burning in the Heat of Love"	Holder, Lea	3:38

== Critical reception ==
Professional ratings
Review scores
Source	Rating
AllMusic	4.5/5 stars
CMJ New Music Monthly	favourable
OffBeat	favourable

Stephen Thomas Erlewine of AllMusic commented: "In for a Penny: Raves & Faves functions as a "more of the best" companion to Shout! Factory's excellent 2004 Get Yer Boots On: The Best of Slade. In for a Penny concentrates on hits that didn't climb as high on the charts, as well as deep album tracks, B-sides, and non-LP singles. This isn't much use for big hardcore fans, since most of the rarities appear on expanded reissues or other British comps, but this isn't designed with them in mind: it's for those who have Get Yer Boots On, or some other hits compilation, and want to hear more. [The] compilation producers sort through the abundance of Slade recordings and whittles it down to a dynamite 15-track collection. Even if they're not quite as timeless as Slade's biggest hits, these are pieces of glittering trash from the litterbin that are as much giddy fun as anything on Get Yer Boots On, which means anybody who loved that disc shouldn't hesitate to pick this set up."

CMJ New Music Monthly wrote: "This is the companion jam to the fine Get Yer Boots On: The Best of Slade. Nab that first if you haven't yet acquainted yourself with this fab band of platform-pouncing, plaid-unitard glam geniuses. If there actually was anything way-out and groovy about the '70s, Slade is the embodiment of it. Huge gods in the UK, they never made much of a dent here until Quiet Riot covered, like, 20 of their songs in the '80s. But don't hold that against Slade. Contrary to the usual critical putdowns of their genre's teen-bubblegum tendencies, the craw-hooking singalongs and Nuggets-era covers here prove Slade's deep knowledge of big harmonies, rugged riffs and really funny phrases about constant sexual pursuit. With loopy off-the-beaten-hits rarities, swell liner note stories for each one and garish band pics, the only complaint is that the mastering is whack, with some tunes much louder than others. Otherwise, you're in for a pound."

Jan Ramsey of OffBeat stated: "In For a Penny is Shout! Factory's second cull from Slade's catalog, and oddly, it might be a better starting place than 2004's Get Yer Boots On or Sladest. Without the hits that defined the band, In for a Penny shows Slade to be a really good, hard blues band, not quite a garage band but one with a garage band's edge. It opens with a version of "Shape of Things to Come" that easily cuts the Yardbirds' version, and only slows down for the gentle pop "When the Lights Are Out.""

== Personnel ==
Slade

- Noddy Holder – lead vocals, rhythm guitar
- Dave Hill – lead guitar, backing vocals
- Jim Lea – bass, piano, violin, keyboards, backing vocals
- Don Powell – drums

Additional personnel

- Chas Chandler – producer
- Dan Epstein – compilation producer, liner notes
- Derek Dressler – compilation producer
- Jeff Palo – compilation production
- Emily Johnson – artwork, package supervision
- Modern Dog Design Co. – package design
- Kate de Vriend – editorial supervision
- MichaelOchsArchives.com – photography
- Slade, Colin Newman – project management
- Dave McIntosh – business affairs
