= Skweeze Me, Pleeze Me =

Single by Slade
- B-side: "Kill 'Em at the Hot Club Tonite"
- Released: 22 June 1973; September 1973 (US)
- Recorded: 1973
- Genre: Hard rock; glam rock
- Length: 3:31 (single version); 4:28 (full version)
- Label: Polydor
- Songwriters: Noddy Holder; Jim Lea
- Producer: Chas Chandler

Slade singles chronology
"Cum On Feel the Noize" (1973)	"Skweeze Me, Pleeze Me" (1973)	"My Friend Stan" (1973)

Audio sample
- file; help

"Skweeze Me, Pleeze Me" is a song by the British rock band Slade, released in 1973 as a non-album single. It was written by lead vocalist Noddy Holder and bassist Jim Lea, and produced by Chas Chandler. It reached No. 1 in the UK, giving the band their fifth number one single, and remained in the charts for ten weeks. The song was certified UK Silver by BPI in July 1973. The song would be included on the band's 1973 compilation album Sladest.

== Background ==
Earlier in 1973, Slade achieved their fourth number one "Cum On Feel the Noize", which was also the band's first single to reach the number one spot in its first week. This achievement had not been seen since The Beatles' "Get Back" in 1969. While on tour in America, the band entered A&M Studios in Los Angeles to record the follow-up single "Skweeze Me, Pleeze Me". Released in June 1973, the song also reached the top spot in its first week, making Slade the first artist to enter at number one with consecutive singles. It remained at No. 1 for three consecutive weeks, and sold 300,000 copies in its first week of release.

Lea originally had the idea for the chorus of "Skweeze Me, Pleeze Me" after visiting the band's regular pub, The Trumpet in Bilston, where he saw local pianist Reg Kierle performing there. During the release of the song, drummer Don Powell was involved in a near-fatal car crash in July, briefly throwing the band's existence into doubt. Despite his critical condition, Powell was able to make a recovery and the band entered the studio to record material for their next album Old New Borrowed and Blue later in the year.

== Release ==
"Skweeze Me, Pleeze Me" was released on 7" vinyl by Polydor Records in the UK, Ireland, across Europe, Scandinavia, Australia, New Zealand, South Africa, Israel, Argentina and Japan. In America, it was released by Reprise Records. The B-side, "Kill 'Em at the Hot Club Tonite", was exclusive to the single and would later appear on the band's 2007 compilation B-Sides. The band had briefly considered releasing the B-side as a novelty single, however Powell's car crash caused the idea to be scrapped. In America, the B-side was the Old New Borrowed and Blue album track "My Town".

== Promotion ==
No music video was filmed to promote the single. The band appeared twice on the UK music show Top of the Pops prior to Powell's crash (22 June and 29 June). Afterwards, the producers of the show would not allow Slade to perform as a three-piece band, so the 6 July 1973 broadcast contained footage of the audience dancing instead. Prior to Powell's crash, the band also performed the song, along with its B-side, on the UK TV show Lift Off with Ayshea.

== Critical reception ==
Upon release, Record Mirror commented on Holder's vocals as being given a "satisfactory showcase". Although they felt the song was not dissimilar to the band's previous material, they added: "that rolling rhythm pushes the whole thing along with alarming verve and gusto". New Musical Express said: "The start is fussy, and those "whoa-whoa's" in the chorus are a drag. The beat's strong and the words in the verses are the best yet, but all around this doesn't beat "Mama Weer All Crazee Now" or "Gudbuy T'Jane"." American magazine Cash Box listed the single as one of their "picks of the week" during November 1973. They felt the song represented "usual hard driving fare" from the band and predicted it would "give them their first major Stateside hit".

== Controversy ==
The song's chorus lyric "When a girl's meaning 'yes' she says 'no'" has attracted criticism for apparently being contrary to the principle of female sexual consent.

== Track listing ==
7" single

1. "Skweeze Me, Pleeze Me" – 3:31
2. "Kill 'Em at the Hot Club Tonite" – 3:20

7" single (US release)

1. "Skweeze Me, Pleeze Me" – 2:55
2. "My Town" – 3:07

7" single (US promo)

1. "Skweeze Me, Pleeze Me" – 2:55
2. "Skweeze Me, Pleeze Me" – 2:55

== Cover versions ==
- In 1973, Finnish singer Muska recorded a version of the song for her self-titled album. The song is titled "Sä Oot Pliisu".
- In 1973, German composer and big band leader James Last recorded an instrumental orchestrated version of the song for the album Non Stop Dancing 1974.
- In 1998, tribute band Glam Rock All-Stars recorded a medley track along with other Slade songs "Cum On Feel the Noize", "Mama Weer All Crazee Now" and "Gudbuy T'Jane" for the album Glam Rock Party Supermix.
- In 2001, Scottish rock vocalist Doogie White (ex-member of Rainbow) recorded a version of the track for the tribute album Slade Remade.

== Personnel ==
Slade

- Noddy Holder – lead vocals, guitar
- Dave Hill – lead guitar, backing vocals
- Jim Lea – bass, backing vocals
- Don Powell – drums

Additional personnel

- Chas Chandler – producer

== Charts ==
Chart performance for "Skweeze Me, Pleeze Me"
Chart (1973)	Peak position
Australia (Kent Music Report)	39
Austria (Ö3 Austria Top 40)	12
Belgium (Ultratop 50 Flanders)	11
Belgium (Ultratop 50 Wallonia)	16
Finland (Suomen virallinen lista)	4
Ireland (IRMA)	1
Netherlands (Dutch Top 40)	11
Netherlands (Single Top 100)	6
Norway (VG-lista)	3
Switzerland (Schweizer Hitparade)	4
UK Singles (OCC)	1
West Germany (GfK)	3

== Certifications ==
Certifications for "Skweeze Me, Pleeze Me"
Region	Certification	Certified units/sales
United Kingdom (BPI)	Silver	250,000^{^}
^{^} Shipments figures based on certification alone.
