= Take Me Bak 'Ome =

- UK/European cover of "Tak Me Bak 'Ome".

Single by Slade
- B-side: "Wonderin' Y"
- Released: 19 May 1972
- Recorded: 1972
- Genre: Rock
- Length: 3:13
- Label: Polydor
- Songwriters: Noddy Holder, Jim Lea
- Producer: Chas Chandler

Slade singles chronology
| "Look Wot You Dun" (1972) | "Take Me Bak 'Ome" (1972) | "Mama Weer All Crazee Now" (1972) |

Audio sample
- file; help

"Take Me Bak 'Ome" is a song by the British rock band Slade, released in 1972 as a non-album single. It was written by lead vocalist Noddy Holder and bassist Jim Lea, and produced by Chas Chandler. It reached No. 1 in the UK, giving the band their second number one single, and remained in the charts for thirteen weeks. The song was certified UK Silver by BPI in 1972. In the United States, the song reached No. 97. The song would be included on the band's 1973 compilation album Sladest.

== Background ==
After achieving their breakthrough hit with "Get Down and Get With It" in 1971, Slade would continue to achieve further success with their follow-up singles "Coz I Luv You" and "Look Wot You Dun", and the live album Slade Alive!. In May 1972, the band released "Take Me Bak' Ome", which reached No. 1 in the UK and was a hit across Europe and beyond. In the United States, the song was the band's chart debut on the Billboard Hot 100, where it reached No. 97.

Shortly after the single's release, Slade played at the Great Western Festival near Lincoln. Before their performance, the band had fears over whether or not they could win over the 50,000-strong crowd. Now deemed a 'pop band', the announcement of their imminent appearance on the stage was met with outbreaks of booing from the audience. However, the band triumphed at the festival, the music press praised the performance and "Take Me Bak 'Ome" went on to reach No. 1 at the beginning of July. In a 1972 interview with Sounds, guitarist Dave Hill described the song as a "live, earth-dirt song". He said: "I felt much more out of that than I did from all the rest, it projected more, and it wasn't just a hit record. I didn't know if that kind of song could make it, and it was great having a thick, dirty song up at number one."

"Take Me Bak 'Ome" was the next single after "Coz I Luv You" to be written by the band's successful Holder/Lea songwriting partnership. In the band's 1984 biography Feel the Noize!, Lea recalled: ""Take Me Bak 'Ome" was an old song I'd had kicking around for ages. I re-vamped it a bit and nicked a phrase or two from The Beatles' "Everybody's Got Something to Hide Except Me and My Monkey". Nobody ever noticed." During the recording of the song, Holder ab-libbed over the riff in the middle of the song. Lea suggested he change the ab-libs after the original one gave him the idea for the band's next single "Mama Weer All Crazee Now".

== Release ==
"Take Me Bak 'Ome" was released on 7" vinyl by Polydor Records in the UK, Ireland, across Europe, Scandinavia, Turkey, America, South Africa, Australia, New Zealand, Mexico, Israel, Lebanon, Singapore and Japan. The B-side, "Wonderin' Y", was exclusive to the single and would appear on the band's 2007 compilation B-Sides.

== Promotion ==
No music video was filmed to promote the single. In the UK, the band performed the song on the music show Top of the Pops, Lift Off with Ayshea and 2Gs and the Pop People. It was also performed on Sports En Fete France and TopPop. In 1973, the song was performed on the Dutch show Popgala.

== Critical reception ==
Upon release, Record Mirror described the song as a "riff-based number" and commented on Holder's "strident, straight-through-a-brick-wall voice". They concluded: "Powerful and rocking – and their best yet for me". Danny Holloway of the NME called the song a "strong rocker" which shows the "power and punch the band proudly sports" and was lacking on their previous two singles. He added that Holder's vocals are "remarkably good in the traditional shouting approach which sounds like he's using his whole body to sing". In a retrospective song review by AllMusic, Dave Thompson said: "Neither of its predecessors, "Coz I Luv You" or "Look Wot You Dun," had attempted to capture the feel of Slade in full flight. Holder and Jim Lea's "Take Me Bak 'Ome" was custom-built to relieve that deficiency."

== Track listing ==
7" single

1. "Take Me Bak 'Ome" – 3:13
2. "Wonderin' Y" – 2:48

7" single (Singapore EP)

1. "Take Me Bak 'Ome" – 3:13
2. "Wonderin' Y" – 2:48
3. "Darlin' Be Home Soon" – 5:43
4. "Know Who You Are" – 3:37

== Cover versions ==
- In 1973, Vandyke Brown, Unicorn Express and Indigo Blue recorded the song along with Slade tracks "Cum On Feel the Noize" and "Coz I Luv You" for the album Million Copy Hit Songs Made Famous by Slade, T. Rex, Sweet.

== Personnel ==
Slade

- Noddy Holder – lead vocals, rhythm guitar
- Dave Hill – lead guitar, backing vocals
- Jim Lea – bass, backing vocals
- Don Powell – drums

Production

- Chas Chandler – producer

== Charts ==
Chart performance for "Take Me Bak 'Ome"
| Chart (1972) | Peak position |
|---|---|
| Australia (Kent Music Report) | 11 |
| Belgium (Ultratop 50 Flanders) | 11 |
| Belgium (Ultratop 50 Wallonia) | 5 |
| Ireland (IRMA) | 4 |
| Netherlands (Dutch Top 40) | 5 |
| Netherlands (Single Top 100) | 5 |
| UK Singles (Official Charts) | 1 |
| US Billboard Hot 100 | 97 |
| US Cash Box Top 100 Singles | 80 |
| US Record World The Singles Chart | 87 |
| West Germany (GfK) | 10 |
