= Look Wot You Dun =

- UK/European cover of "Look Wot You Dun".

Single by Slade
- B-side: "Candidate"
- Released: 28 January 1972; March 1972 (US)
- Genre: Glam rock
- Length: 2:54
- Label: Polydor
- Songwriters: Noddy Holder, Jim Lea, Don Powell
- Producer: Chas Chandler

Slade singles chronology
"Coz I Luv You" (1971)	"Look Wot You Dun" (1972)	"Take Me Bak 'Ome" (1972)

Audio sample
- file; help

"Look Wot You Dun" is a song by the British rock band Slade, released in 1972 as a non-album single. The song was written by lead vocalist Noddy Holder, bassist Jim Lea and drummer Don Powell, and produced by Chas Chandler. It reached No. 4 in the UK, remaining in the charts for ten weeks. The song would be included on the band's 1973 compilation album Sladest.

== Background ==
After achieving their breakthrough hit with "Get Down and Get With It", Slade saw further success with their follow-up single "Coz I Luv You", which topped the UK chart in October 1971. Released as the follow-up single in January 1972, "Look Wot You Dun" continued the band's success, peaking at No. 4 in the UK. The song was the band's second release to feature their trademark misspelling in the song title, following "Coz I Luv You". Upon its release, "Look Wot You Dun" sparked protest from teachers across the UK as it was felt that the phonetic spellings were causing confusion among pupils.

"Look Wot You Dun" was largely written by Lea and Powell. Once the basic idea of the song was formed, Lea took it to Holder who added his contributions. The song is notable for Powell's contribution to some form of backing vocal, providing the heavy breathing heard in the song's chorus. For the recording of the song, Hill borrowed Peter Frampton's guitar as bad weather over the Christmas period meant his guitar did not arrive at the studio as expected.

== Release ==
"Look Wot You Dun" was released on 7" vinyl by Polydor Records in the UK, Ireland, across Europe, Scandinavia, Yugoslavia, South Africa, Australia, New Zealand, Argentina, Brazil, Lebanon and Japan. In America, it was released by Cotillion. The B-side, "Candidate", would appear on the band's 1972 European compilation Coz I Luv You. It was also included on the 2007 compilation B-Sides.

== Promotion ==
Two music videos were filmed to promote the single, both of which were filmed by Caravelle. The first video was filmed at Chessington Zoo in London. A second video was filmed in a studio and featured the group performing the song, with Holder wearing a magician's outfit. In the UK, the band performed the song on the music show Top of the Pops. In Germany, they also performed it on Hits a GoGo.

== Critical reception ==
Upon its release, Derek Johnson of the NME believed the band could score their second number one hit with "Look Wot You Dun". He considered the "immensely catchy number" to be "good honest pop – unpretentious, enormously entertaining and thoroughly irresistible". He added that is "heavily laden with the same sort of gimmicks that proved so successful on their previous single", including the "ungrammatical but colloquial title, and that startling pistol-shot beat". Kevin Henry of the Manchester Evening News praised it as a "captivating piece of rock" on which the band "slow down the tempo, but [keep] the excitement and the rhythm to the fore". Deborah Thomas of the Daily Mirror called it "a misspelt smash of beat up blues". Mark Nelson of the Chester Chronicle believed Slade would have "a monster No. 1 hit on their hands" with the song and noted the "really great thumping beat that will make you want to dance every time you hear it". He added, "It's gimmicky, but irresistible." In the US, Cash Box considered the song to have "that closet-Lennon sound" and "many gimmicks", but "is basically a solid programming item on musical merits alone" and "has got to be the one to establish British charttoppers here".

== Track listing ==
7" single

1. "Look Wot You Dun" – 2:45
2. "Candidate" – 2:40

7" single (US promo)

1. "Look Wot You Dun" – 2:45
2. "Look Wot You Dun" – 2:45

== Cover versions ==
- In 1972, Alan Caddy Orchestra and Singers released an orchestral cover of the song on the album Six Top Hits.
- In 1972, Finnish singer Markku Aro recorded the song under the name "Täyttä Totta" which appeared on the album Oo - Mikä Nainen. Additional writing credit went to Leo Länsi for changed lyrics.
- In 1973, East German rock band Puhdys recorded the song "Geh zu ihr", which was based on "Look Wot You Dun", for the film The Legend of Paul and Paula after director Heiner Carow was unable to secure the rights to the original. The song appeared on the album Puhdys 1.
- In 2001, English vocalist/musician Steve Overland recorded a version of the track for the tribute album Slade Remade.
- In 2014, French Big-Rock band Furious Zoo recorded a version of the song on their seventh album Back to Blues Rock.

== Personnel ==
Slade

- Noddy Holder – lead vocals
- Dave Hill – lead guitar, backing vocals
- Jim Lea – piano, bass, backing vocals
- Don Powell – drums

Additional personnel

- Chas Chandler – producer

== Charts ==
Chart performance for "Look Wot You Dun"
Chart (1972)	Peak position
Australia (Kent Music Report)	43
Belgium (Ultratop 50 Flanders)	12
Belgium (Ultratop 50 Wallonia)	14
Finland (Suomen virallinen lista)	27
Ireland (IRMA)	6
Netherlands (Dutch Top 40)	2
Netherlands (Single Top 100)	2
UK Singles (OCC)	4
West Germany (GfK)	14
