= Cum On Feel the Noize =

1973 single by Slade

- UK/European cover of "Cum On Feel the Noize".

Single by Slade
- B-side: "I'm Mee, I'm Now, an' That's Orl"
- Released: 23 February 1973 (Europe); 21 April 1973 (US)
- Recorded: January–February 1973
- Genre: Glam rock; hard rock
- Length: 4:24
- Label: Polydor
- Songwriters: Noddy Holder; Jim Lea
- Producer: Chas Chandler

Slade singles chronology
"Gudbuy T' Jane" (1972)	"Cum On Feel the Noize" (1973)	"Skweeze Me, Pleeze Me" (1973)

Audio sample
- file; help

Alternative covers
- German/European cover of "Cum On Feel the Noize"

Alternative cover
- Dutch cover of "Cum On Feel the Noize".

"Cum On Feel the Noize" is a song by English rock band Slade which was released in 1973 as a non-album single. It was written by lead vocalist Noddy Holder and bassist Jim Lea and produced by Chas Chandler. It reached No. 1 in the UK Singles Chart, giving the band their fourth number one single, and remained in the charts for twelve weeks. In a UK poll in 2015 it was voted 15th on the ITV special The Nation's Favourite 70s Number One.

In 1983, the American heavy metal band Quiet Riot recorded their own version of the song, which was a million-selling hit single in the United States, reaching No. 5 on the Billboard Hot 100.

== Background ==
Slade released "Cum On Feel the Noize" in February 1973 as their first single of the year. The song gave the band their fourth number one in the UK, and it was also their first single to reach number one in its first week. This achievement had not been seen since The Beatles' "Get Back" in 1969. The song remained there for four consecutive weeks and sold 500,000 copies in its first three weeks of release. With "Cum On Feel the Noize", the band's manager Chas Chandler and Polydor's head John Fruin had devised a strategy to get the single to number one on the first week of release. The strategy used pre-release airplay to build up pre-order sales for the single. In America, the song reached No. 98 on the Billboard Hot 100.

"Cum On Feel the Noize" detailed the atmosphere found at the band's concerts. Originally titled "Cum On Hear the Noize", Holder changed the title after recalling one of the band's 1972 UK concerts, where he "felt the sound of the crowd pounding in [his] chest". The song's introduction of Holder shouting "Baby, baby, baby" had just been a microphone test and was not intended for the finished recording.

In a 1984 interview with Record Mirror, Lea spoke of "Mama Weer All Crazee Now" and "Cum On Feel the Noize": "I was at a Chuck Berry gig in '72 and everybody was singing his tunes. He kept stopping and letting the crowd sing and it wasn't just a few people, it was everyone. I thought it was amazing and thought – why not write the crowd into the songs, and so we got round to 'Mama Weer All Crazee Now' and 'Cum On Feel the Noize' and all the chants were written into the tunes." In a 1986 fan club interview, guitarist Dave Hill said: "The song was based around audiences and things that were happening to us. They were just experiences. Obviously, when you are on the road, you are writing about being on the road, you're writing about what's going on."

== Release ==
"Cum On Feel the Noize" was released as a 7" single by Polydor Records in the UK, Ireland, across Europe, Scandinavia, Yugoslavia, America, Israel, South Africa, Australia, New Zealand, Argentina, Brazil, Mexico, Singapore, Japan and Lebanon. The B-side, "I'm Mee, I'm Now, an' That's Orl", was exclusive to the single and later appeared on the band's 2007 compilation B-Sides.

In December 1983, the song was re-issued by Polydor in the UK as both 7" and 12" singles. It reached No. 98 and remained in the charts for two weeks. The 7" version featured "Take Me Bak 'Ome" and "Gudbuy T'Jane" as the extra tracks, while the 12" version added "Coz I Luv You".

== Promotion ==
A music video was filmed to promote the single. It was created by Caravelle and recorded at the band's concert at the Hague in the Netherlands. The song was also performed on numerous UK and European TV shows upon release, including the UK music show Top of the Pops.

== Critical reception ==
Upon release, Disc commented: "Slade do this pop/rock stomping better than anyone. Perhaps there's a more obvious melody, but Slade always include a bit of a tune anyway and therein lies their success, and there's a soccer sing-a-long chorus that'll grab you." Sounds described the song as a "rousing, raucous, rocker that follows its predecessors with an instantly recognisable sound". American magazine Cash Box listed the single as one of their "picks of the week" during April 1973. They felt it was another "rollicking rock effort", "teaming [sic] with commercial appeal".

In a retrospective review of the song, Dave Thompson of AllMusic described the song as "a deafening roar in the classic Slade mould" with a "distinctive lyric". He also commented on the "Baby, baby, baby" introduction, stating it was "one of the most distinctive intros of the age". In a retrospective review of Sladest, Paul Tinelli of AllMusic included the song as one of the band's "finest moments" and described it as an "arena rocker that would get kids up off their seats". In 1999, Q magazine listed "Cum On Feel the Noize" at No. 96 in their poll of the Top 100 singles of all time. In 2005, they listed the song at No. 62 in their poll "100 Greatest Guitar Tracks Ever!".

== Track listings and formats ==
7" single

1. "Cum On Feel the Noize" – 4:24
2. "I'm Mee, I'm Now, An' That's Orl" – 3:41

7" single (US promo)

1. "Cum On Feel the Noize" – 4:24
2. "Cum On Feel the Noize" – 4:24

7" single (Singapore EP)

1. "Cum On Feel the Noize" – 4:24
2. "I'm Mee, I'm Now, An' That's Orl" – 3:41
3. "Get Down and Get with It" – 4:12
4. "Gudbuy Gudbuy" – 3:30

7" single (1975 Australian EP)

1. "Cum On Feel the Noize" – 4:24
2. "Mama Weer All Crazee Now" – 3:45
3. "Everyday" – 3:11
4. "Skweeze Me, Pleeze Me" – 3:31

7" single (1983 UK re-issue)

1. "Cum On Feel the Noize" – 4:24
2. "Take Me Bak 'Ome" – 3:13
3. "Gudbuy T' Jane" – 3:31

12" single (1983 UK re-issue)

1. "Cum On Feel the Noize" – 4:24
2. "Take Me Bak 'Ome" – 3:13
3. "Gudbuy T' Jane" – 3:31
4. "Coz I Luv You" – 3:24

== Personnel ==
Slade

- Noddy Holder – lead vocals, rhythm guitar
- Dave Hill – lead guitar, backing vocals
- Jim Lea – bass, backing vocals
- Don Powell – drums, backing vocals

Additional personnel

- Chas Chandler – producer

== Charts ==
=== Weekly charts ===
Chart performance for "Cum On Feel the Noize"
Chart (1973)	Peak position
Australia (Kent Music Report)	12
Austria (Ö3 Austria Top 40)	10
Belgium (Ultratop 50 Flanders)	5
Belgium (Ultratop 50 Wallonia)	3
Finland (Suomen virallinen lista)	10
Ireland (IRMA)	1
Netherlands (Dutch Top 40)	8
Netherlands (Single Top 100)	6
Switzerland (Schweizer Hitparade)	4
UK Singles (Official Charts)	1
US Billboard Hot 100	98
US Cash Box Top 100	91
US Record World The Singles Chart	63
West Germany (GfK)	8

=== 1983 UK reissue ===
Chart performance for "Cum On Feel the Noize" (1983 UK reissue)
Chart (1983)	Peak position
UK Singles (Official Charts)	98

== Quiet Riot version ==
"Cum On Feel the Noize"
- Japanese single sleeve

Single by Quiet Riot

from the album Metal Health
- B-side: "Run for Cover"
- Released: 11 July 1983
- Genre: Glam metal; hard rock; arena rock
- Length: 4:50 (album version); 3:20 (single edit)
- Label: Pasha
- Songwriters: Noddy Holder; Jim Lea
- Producer: Spencer Proffer

Quiet Riot singles chronology
"Slick Black Cadillac" (1978)	"Cum On Feel the Noize" (1983)	"Bang Your Head (Metal Health)" (1983)

In 1983, American heavy metal band Quiet Riot covered the song. Their version went on to reach No. 5 on the Billboard Hot 100 in November 1983 and helped their album Metal Health become a number-one hit. The song's success drew huge nationwide attention to the 1980s Los Angeles metal scene and also helped to break Slade belatedly in the US in 1984, after signing a deal with CBS. The song was certified gold by the RIAA. In 2002, Quiet Riot's version of "Cum On Feel the Noize" was ranked No. 80 on VH1's 100 Greatest One-Hit Wonders. In 2009, VH1 also ranked it No. 41 of the "best hard rock songs of all time".

Originally, lead vocalist Kevin DuBrow was dead set against covering the song, because he wanted the band to write every song on the album as well as the fact he was not a big fan of Slade. Instead, the band decided to try to cover the song as badly as they could so the label would refuse to release it.

In a 1983 interview with Kerrang!, Holder spoke of the Quiet Riot version:

The first Slade knew about Quiet Riot was when they approached our publisher for permission to do "Cum On Feel the Noize". We agreed, never believing something like this would happen. The really nice thing about the whole affair is that it proves how strong our songs are. After all; "Cum On Feel the Noize" is now ten years old, so it's obviously stood the test of time rather well! We've actually been approached in the recent past by people wanting us to update one of our classics. But, not even seeing what a band like Quiet Riot have done so successfully with modern studio technology on an old Slade tune has persuaded us it's worth doing. There was a spontaneity and electricity about the numbers when we first did 'em that could never be recaptured now. There just wouldn't be the same feel so, no matter how much money is offered. We're not into prostituting our own heritage.

Speaking to Record Mirror in 1983, Lea stated: "Quiet Riot phoned us up and asked if they could use the song. They were a bit cheeky really because they had already recorded it. I think they've done a very good version. Because of the success of the song in the States, we've also got five major record companies trying to outbid each other and sign us to a major deal. We've had ridiculous offers coming over the phone. We'll give you five Rolls Royces if you go with us, that kind of thing."

In a Ludwig drums interview, Quiet Riot's drummer Frankie Banali said:

"I think [Slade] were a little bitter about our success with their song. They had a hit with it in other territories but not in the US and later our version overshadowed theirs worldwide. Any real success in the US always seemed to elude Slade, so Quiet Riot having a major hit with "Cum On Feel the Noize" was bittersweet for them. When Quiet Riot played the Hammersmith Odeon in London in 1983, we offered them an invitation complete with a limo service to attend the show, but they never responded. Later I was shopping in Kensington Market and ran into Jimmy Lea. I wanted to shake his hand and thank him for writing a great song. He looked into my face, and walked away leaving me with nothing in my hand but air! I look at the situation like this: Quiet Riot received a great measure of success with the help of that song, and Slade received a great deal of money for their trouble. Fair enough!"

=== Music video ===
The music video for Quiet Riot's version was a staple on MTV. It featured a teenage boy in his bedroom waking up to turn off his alarm then, accidentally turning on his stereo in the corner (which is simply an AM/FM receiver on top of two standard rectangular speakers) which starts the song. Suddenly the room starts shaking, and the stereo starts getting larger and larger and louder and louder (with the speakers now wedge shaped and emitting strobe lights). As the boy looks up at the "Metal Health Mask", a flashback appears of Dubrow throwing the mask in a crowd, then cuts back to the room to show same mask appears on his wall, above his bed, suggesting that the boy got that mask from a Quiet Riot concert. The boy tries twice to futilely turn the volume down on the now massive sized receiver, then tries pulling the plug on it. When he does and the plug comes out of the wall, it is as huge as the stereo and appears to knock him out. The band is then shown playing the rest of the song. At the end, the boy wakes up, realizing it was all a dream, and everything is back to normal, including the size of his stereo system.

=== Charts ===
Chart (1983–1984)	Peak position
Australian Singles (Kent Music Report)	9
Canada Top Singles (RPM)	8
New Zealand (Recorded Music NZ)	34
UK Singles (Official Charts) with "Metal Health"	45
US Billboard Hot 100	5
US Mainstream Rock Airplay (Billboard)	7

=== Year-end charts ===
Chart (1984)	Peak position
Australia (Kent Music Report)	47
Canada (RPM)	80
US Top Pop Singles (Billboard)	68

=== Sales certifications ===
Region	Certification	Certified units/sales
Canada (Music Canada)	Gold	50,000^{^}
United States (RIAA)	Gold	1,000,000^{^}
^{^} Shipments figures based on certification alone.

== See also ==
- Illinois – a 2005 album by Sufjan Stevens also entitled Sufjan Stevens Invites You To: Come On Feel the Illinoise!
- List of UK Singles Chart number ones of the 1970s
