= Gudbuy T'Jane =

1972 song by British rock band Slade

- German/European cover of "Gudbuy T'Jane".

Single by Slade

from the album Slayed?
- B-side: "I Won't Let It 'Appen Agen"
- Released: 17 November 1972
- Genre: Glam rock, hard rock
- Length: 3:33
- Label: Polydor
- Songwriters: Noddy Holder, Jim Lea
- Producer: Chas Chandler

Slade singles chronology
"Mama Weer All Crazee Now" (1972)	"Gudbuy T'Jane" (1972)	"Cum On Feel the Noize" (1973)

Audio sample
- file; help

"Gudbuy T'Jane" is a song by the British rock band Slade, released on 17 November 1972 as the second single from their third studio album, Slayed? It was written by lead vocalist Noddy Holder and bassist Jim Lea, and produced by Chas Chandler. It reached No. 2 in the UK, remaining in the charts for thirteen weeks. The song was certified UK Silver by BPI in 1973. In the United States, the song reached No. 68. It was also included on the band's 1973 compilation album Sladest.

== Background ==
During 1972, Slade recorded their third studio album Slayed?, with the lead single "Mama Weer All Crazee Now" being released in August that year. The song topped the UK chart and "Gudbuy T'Jane" followed as a single in November, by which time Slayed? had already been released earlier in the month. "Gudbuy T'Jane" reached No. 2 in the UK. The song reached No. 1 on the New Musical Express Chart, and was also Slade's most successful single of the 1970s in the United States, where it reached No. 68.

The idea for "Gudbuy T'Jane" came to Lea while the band were on an American tour. He first had the idea for the song while sitting by a pool in San Francisco, and then completed the song in the toilet on the plane flight home. Holder, who finished the lyrics, originally changed "Gudbuy T'Jane" to "Hello T'Jane". However, Lea felt his original idea sounded better. The titular character was based on a real-life woman who demonstrated a sex machine on an American TV show on which the band appeared. When recording the song, the band settled on their second take. They attributed the loose feel of the recording to the fact they had not played the song until the day of its recording.

In a 1980 interview with Sounds, Lea said of the band's past hits: "I didn't even like some of those old ones. We all hated "Gudbuy T'Jane" when we made it. It was knocked up in half an hour at the end of one of our studio sessions." In a 1981 fan club interview, drummer Don Powell cited "Gudbuy T'Jane" as one of his favourite Slade songs.

== Release ==
"Gudbuy T'Jane" was released on 7" vinyl by Polydor Records in the UK, Ireland, across Europe, America, Canada, Scandinavia, Yugoslavia, Australia, New Zealand, South Africa, Argentina, Brazil, Singapore and Japan. The B-side, "I Won't Let It 'Appen Agen", had appeared on Slayed? as an album track.

== Promotion ==
Two music videos were filmed to promote the single, both of which were filmed by Caravelle. The first portrayed the band as scientists in an observatory, sporting white coats and clipboards. The second film was recorded at the Rainbow Theatre in London on the afternoon before the band's concert there. Performing the song on the stage, the video shows the band's clothes and instruments covered with "I've Been Slayed" stickers. Later during the actual concert, footage of the audience was filmed during the band's performance of their opener "Hear Me Calling" for use in the video.

In the UK, the band performed the song on the BBC music show Top of the Pops. The band also performed the song on the German TV show Musikladen and the Dutch AVRO TV show TopPop.

== Critical reception ==
Upon release, Record Mirror commented on the song's "instant power and drive", Holder's "usual gruff efficiency" and the "hustling bass-percussion rhythm". Danny Holloway of New Musical Express said the song was a "rigid rocker" with a "simple little drum intro as the guitars join in, followed by a ferocious bass line". In a review of the compilation album Sladest, Paul Tinelli of AllMusic included the song as one of the band's "finest moments" and described it as an "arena rocker that would get kids up off their seats".

== Track listing ==
7" single

1. "Gudbuy T'Jane" – 3:31
2. "I Won't Let It 'Appen Agen" – 3:15

7" single (US promo)

1. "Gudbuy T'Jane" – 3:31
2. "Gudbuy T'Jane" – 3:31

7" single (Singapore EP)

1. "Gudbuy T'Jane" – 3:31
2. "Look at Last Nite" – 3:06
3. "Mama Weer All Crazee Now" – 3:45
4. "I Won't Let It 'Appen Agen" – 3:15

== Personnel ==
Slade

- Noddy Holder – lead vocals, rhythm guitar
- Dave Hill – lead guitar, backing vocals
- Jim Lea – bass, backing vocals
- Don Powell – drums

Additional personnel

- Chas Chandler – producer

== Charts ==
Chart performance for "Gudbuy T'Jane"
Chart (1972–73)	Peak position
Australia (Kent Music Report)	11
Austria (Ö3 Austria Top 40)	7
Belgium (Ultratop 50 Flanders)	5
Belgium (Ultratop 50 Wallonia)	8
Canada Top Singles (RPM)	72
Finland (Suomen virallinen lista)	7
Ireland (IRMA)	2
Netherlands (Dutch Top 40)	4
Netherlands (Single Top 100)	4
Norway (VG-lista)	7
Switzerland (Schweizer Hitparade)	4
UK Singles (Official Charts)	2
US Billboard Hot 100	68
US Cash Box Top 100	62
US Record World The Singles Chart	69
West Germany (GfK)	3
