= Coz I Luv You =

- UK/European cover of "Coz I Luv You".

Single by Slade
- B-side: "My Life is Natural"
- Released: 8 October 1971; December 1971 (US)
- Recorded: 1971
- Genre: Soft rock
- Length: 3:24
- Label: Polydor
- Songwriters: Noddy Holder, Jim Lea
- Producer: Chas Chandler

Slade singles chronology
"Get Down and Get with It" (1971)	"Coz I Luv You" (1971)	"Look Wot You Dun" (1972)

Official audio
- "Coz I Luv You" on YouTube

Alternative Covers
- Dutch cover of "Coz I Luv You".

Alternative cover

"Coz I Luv You" is a song by the British rock band Slade, released in 1971 as a non-album single. It was written by lead vocalist Noddy Holder and bassist Jim Lea, and produced by Chas Chandler. It reached number 1 in the UK Singles Chart, giving the band their first number one single, and remained in the top 50 for fifteen weeks.

In 1972, a compilation album of the same name would be released outside the UK. The song was included on the compilation and would also feature on the band's 1973 compilation album Sladest.

== Background ==
Slade achieved their commercial breakthrough with the release of their version of Bobby Marchan's "Get Down and Get with It" in May 1971. Deciding to capture their strong reputation as a live act onto record, "Get Down and Get with It" was seen as the perfect choice as the band frequently played it live to a great response. Successfully breaking the band into the UK and Europe, it reached No. 16 in the UK. "Coz I Luv You" was soon recorded as the follow-up single. Released in October 1971, it reached No. 1 in the UK and was also a hit across Europe and elsewhere.

"Coz I Luv You" features electric violin played by Lea. The song was written after Chandler insisted the band write an original song as their next single. One evening, Lea turned up at Holder's home with his violin and an idea for a song after hearing "Nine By Nine" by the John Dummer Blues Band. Lea suggested that he and Holder write a song which had a Django Reinhardt/Stéphane Grappelli "Hot Club"-influence. The pair wrote the song in half an hour and began the successful songwriting partnership of Holder/Lea, which would go on to write the bulk of Slade's material. The following day, the band played the song acoustically to Chandler, who responded: "I think you've written your first hit record. In fact, I think you've written your first No. 1."

Immediately booking the band into Olympic Studios in Barnes, the song was recorded in two days. Although Chandler liked the song, the band were less enthusiastic as they believed it to be too poppy and weak-sounding in comparison to "Get Down and Get with It". In the effort to make the record more Slade-like, the band added foot-stomping and hand-clapping to it. Furthermore, the band thought the original title, "Because I Love You", did not suit the band's image or sound. Holder then suggested spelling the title to reflect their Black County dialect. The title then became "Coz I Luv You", which marked the beginning of Slade's misspelling trademark.

In a 1980 interview with Sounds, Lea said of the song: "I didn't even like some of those old ones. "Coz I Luv You" was namby-pamby to us, a throwaway for an album. It shot to number one in two weeks and we thought, "What a pile of shit!" It was so wet." Later in a 1984 interview with Record Mirror, Lea said: "One afternoon I went over to Nod's and I said "Hey Nod, why don't we write a song?". I took my violin with me and said why don't we do a Stephan Grappelli thing. "Hot Love" was in the charts at the time - Marc Bolan, and I said something like that, dead simple and we wrote the song in half an hour. We got the structure of the tune and Nod just filled in the gaps. That's the only song we've ever written like that."

== Release ==
"Coz I Luv You" was released on 7" vinyl by Polydor Records in the United Kingdom, Ireland, across Europe, Scandinavia, Yugoslavia, Israel, Canada, South Africa, Australia, New Zealand, Argentina, Brazil and Japan. In the United States it was released by Cotillion. The B-side, "My Life is Natural", would appear on the band's 1972 compilation Coz I Luv You. It was also included on the 2007 compilation B-Sides. In 1977 and again in 1987, the single was re-issued in Germany. In 1983, it was re-issued in Belgium. In 1993, the song was re-issued in Germany again, but on CD.

"Coz I Luv You" was later featured in the 1998 film Velvet Goldmine and in the launch advert for the Ford Transit. The song was also used in an episode of the BBC drama Life on Mars. The song also features in the 2004 film El Lobo (also known as The Wolf), a political thriller revolving around the Spanish terrorist group ETA.

== Promotion ==
No music video was filmed to promote the single. In the UK, the band performed the song on the UK music show Top of the Pops, once in November 1971 and again on the 1971 Christmas edition. The band also performed the song on the Belgian TV show Popshop and the German TV shows Disco and Beat-Club. In 1973, they performed the song on the Dutch show Popgala.

== Critical reception ==
Upon release, Record Mirror felt the song was a "natural born successor" to "Get Down and Get With It". They described the song as a "sturdy foot-pounding sort of build up" and a "really persistent ear-bender". New Musical Express said the song "should satisfy both the mainstream pop and the heavy brigade", describing it as a "rousing hard-hitting number, generating bags of electricity and urgency, but nevertheless blessed with a strong melody line and a chorus". In 2011, The Guardian retrospectively said: "It was all about the stomp: "Coz I Luv You"'s bootboy rhythm anchored its swirling, menacing violin line and the two combined to give this single its frightening, primitive edge."

== Track listings and formats ==
7" single

1. "Coz I Luv You" – 3:24
2. "My Life Is Natural" – 3:12

7" single (Israel release)

1. "Coz I Luv You" – 3:24
2. "Get Down and Get with It" – 4:12

7" single (US promo)

1. "Coz I Luv You" – 3:24
2. "Coz I Luv You" – 3:24

7" single (German "Golden Greats" series re-issue)

1. "Coz I Luv You" – 3:24
2. "Mama Weer All Crazee Now" – 3:43

7" single (Belgian "Golden Oldies" re-issue)

1. "Coz I Luv You" – 3:24
2. "Gudbuy T'Jane" – 3:33

CD single (German 1993 release)

1. "Coz I Luv You" – 3:30
2. "Gudbuy T'Jane" – 3:30
3. "I Don't Mind" – 3:06

== Personnel ==
Slade

- Noddy Holder – lead vocals, rhythm guitar
- Dave Hill – lead guitar, backing vocals
- Jim Lea – violin, bass, backing vocals
- Don Powell – drums

Additional personnel

- Chas Chandler – producer

== Charts ==
Chart performance for "Coz I Luv You"
Chart (1971)	Peak position
Australia (Kent Music Report)	7
Belgium (Ultratop 50 Flanders)	7
Belgium (Ultratop 50 Wallonia)	5
Ireland (IRMA)	1
Netherlands (Dutch Top 40)	3
Netherlands (Single Top 100)	2
UK Singles (Official Charts)	1
West Germany (GfK)	9

== Cover versions ==
- In 1971, Alan Caddy Orchestra and Singers released a cover of the song on the album Six Top Hits.
- In 1973, Vandyke Brown, Unicorn Express and Indigo Blue recorded the song along with Slade tracks "Cum On Feel the Noize" and "Take Me Bak 'Ome" for the album Million Copy Hit Songs Made Famous by Slade, T. Rex, Sweet.
- In 1991, Ian Edmundson recorded a cover of the song under the pseudonym Go Crazy, as a tribute to Slade's 25th anniversary.
- In 1992, British alternative rock band The Wonder Stuff recorded the song for the various artists compilation album Ruby Trax - The NME's Roaring Forty.
- In 1994, Jim Lea recorded two versions of the song and released them both as singles. The first was released under the artist name "The X Specials" and the second as "Jimbo featuring Bull".
- In 2000, Noddy Holder recorded an acoustic version for the ITV drama The Grimleys, which starred Holder. The song was later released as an MP3 download in 2008 under Slade's own label Whild John Music Ltd.
- In 2002, German hard rock band Böhse Onkelz recorded the song as a B-Side for their single "Keine Amnestie für MTV".
- Since 2006, English singer James Blunt has occasionally performed the song at his live concerts.
- In 2007, the song was sampled by Evidence for the track "Things You Do" which was included on the album The Weatherman LP.
- In 2015, punk band Vice Squad included the song on their CD single "Run Run Rudolph".
- In 2015, rock band Kamyaniy Gist covered this song in Ukrainian for the album 70/80.
