= Mama Weer All Crazee Now =

- Spanish & European single picture sleeve

Single by Slade

from the album Slayed?
- B-side: "Man Who Speeks Evil"
- Released: 25 August 1972
- Recorded: 1972
- Genre: Hard rock, glam rock
- Length: 3:45
- Label: Polydor
- Songwriters: Noddy Holder, Jim Lea
- Producer: Chas Chandler

Slade singles chronology
"Take Me Bak 'Ome" (1972)	"Mama Weer All Crazee Now" (1972)	"Gudbuy T'Jane" (1972)

Audio sample
- file; help

Alternative covers
- Dutch single picture sleeve

Alternative cover
- Belgian single picture sleeve

"Mama Weer All Crazee Now" is a song by the British rock band Slade, released in 1972 as the lead single from their third studio album Slayed? It was written by lead vocalist Noddy Holder and bassist Jim Lea, and produced by Chas Chandler. It reached No. 1 in the UK, giving the band their third number one single, and remained in the charts for ten weeks. In the United States, the song reached No. 76.

== Background ==
During 1972, Slade recorded their third studio album Slayed?, with the lead single "Mama Weer All Crazee Now" being released in August that year. The single reached No. 1 in the UK and Ireland, and was a hit across Europe and beyond. With the single, Slade and their manager Chas Chandler attempted to reach number one on the first week of release - a feat that had not been achieved since The Beatles' 1969 hit "Get Back". Initially, the band's label Polydor did not think it could be achieved, however when "Mama Weer All Crazee Now" reached No. 2 in its first week, the label changed their minds. A strategy was soon developed which saw "Cum On Feel the Noize", the band's next single, reach No. 1 in its first week of release in March 1973.

"Mama Weer All Crazee Now" was the first tune Lea wrote entirely on his own. Holder got the idea for the lyrics at the band's concert at Wembley Arena in London. After the show, he looked at the remains of the auditorium's smashed seating and thought "Christ, everyone must have been crazy tonight." The song was originally titled "My My We're All Crazy Now". When Holder and Lea played the song acoustically to Chandler for the first time, he thought Holder was singing "Mama We're All Crazy Now". The name was then changed accordingly as Holder and Lea felt Chandler's title was better.

In a 1984 interview with Record Mirror, Lea spoke of "Mama Weer All Crazee" and "Cum On Feel the Noize": "I was at a Chuck Berry gig in '72 and everybody was singing his tunes. He kept stopping and letting the crowd sing and it wasn't just a few people, it was everyone. I thought it was amazing and thought – why not write the crowd into the songs, and so we got round to "Mama Weer All Crazee Now" and "Cum On Feel the Noize" and all the chants were written into the tunes." In his 1999 biography Who's Crazee Now?, Holder recalled: "We had hit on our benchmark sound. It was perfect for Slade, very raucous, but catchy and pop. It was a real powerhouse record. Everyone loved it and everyone knew all the words."

== Release ==
"Mama Weer All Crazee Now" was released on 7" vinyl by Polydor Records in the UK, Ireland, across Europe, Scandinavia, Yugoslavia, America, Turkey, Israel, South Africa, Angola, Australia, New Zealand, Argentina, Brazil, Mexico, Philippines and Japan. The B-side, "Man Who Speeks Evil", was exclusive to the single and would later appear on the band's 2007 compilation B-Sides.

== Promotion ==
No music video was filmed to promote the song. In the UK, the band performed the song on the music show Top of the Pops. In Germany, the song was performed on the TV shows Disco and Musikladen. The band also performed the song on the Dutch AVRO TV show TopPop. Later in 1977, the band performed the song on the UK show Supersonic while promoting their new single "Gypsy Roadhog". In 1981, while promoting "We'll Bring the House Down", the band performed the song on the ITV show Moondogs.

== Critical reception ==
Upon release, Record Mirror noted the song's "hard-driving beat" as being "full of sheer bloody-minded slay them enthusiasm", while retaining a "commercial hook". New Musical Express predicted the song would reach number one, adding: "I consider this their best by far from the fuzzed out guitar intro to the rocking; stomping, chorus through to the crowd singing along at the end". Disc stated: "With howls they tear straight into another huge boogie. By the time this one ends you could believe, so dense does the sound and the atmosphere become, that 50,000 people were roaring along with the band in some distant dark stadium."

In a retrospective song review by AllMusic, Dave Thompson described the song as a "full-on adrenalin monster, ear-splittingly loud with its lyrics a raw-throated bellow". In a review of Sladest, Paul Tinelli of AllMusic included the song as one of the band's "finest moments" and described it as an "arena rocker that would get kids up off their seats".

== Track listing ==
7" single

1. "Mama Weer All Crazee Now" – 3:43
2. "Man Who Speeks Evil" – 3:15

7" single (Argentinean release)

1. "Mama Weer All Crazee Now" – 3:43
2. "Take Me Bak 'Ome" – 3:13

7" single (US promo)

1. "Mama Weer All Crazee Now" – 3:43
2. "Mama Weer All Crazee Now" – 3:43

== Personnel ==
Slade

- Noddy Holder – lead vocals, guitar
- Dave Hill – lead guitar, backing vocals
- Jim Lea – bass, backing vocals
- Don Powell – drums

Additional personnel

- Chas Chandler – producer

== Charts ==
Chart performance for "Mama Weer All Crazee Now"
Chart (1972–73)	Peak position
Australia (Kent Music Report)	14
Austria (Ö3 Austria Top 40)	6
Belgium (Ultratop 50 Flanders)	11
Belgium (Ultratop 50 Wallonia)	5
Finland (Suomen virallinen lista)	11
Ireland (IRMA)	1
Netherlands (Dutch Top 40)	9
Netherlands (Single Top 100)	7
Switzerland (Schweizer Hitparade)	5
UK Singles (OCC)	1
US Billboard Hot 100	76
US Cash Box Top 100 Singles	60
US Record World The Singles Chart	64
West Germany (GfK)	6

== Cover versions ==
- In 1973, Les Humphries Singers & Orchestra released a cover of the song on their album Sound '73.
- In 1973, German composer and big band leader James Last recorded an instrumental orchestrated version of the song for the album Non Stop Dancing 1973.
- In 1978, American rock band The Runaways recorded a cover of the song and included it on their 1979 album And Now... The Runaways.
- In 1984, American heavy metal band Quiet Riot recorded a version for their album Condition Critical. It was released as a single and reached No. 51 on the US Billboard Hot 100. Cash Box said of this cover that "driving metal provides the background for a screeching lead vocal and a ringing chorus." In Canada it reached No. 50.
- In 1984, Irish hard rock band Mama's Boys recorded a cover of the song for their self-titled album. It was also released as a single.
- In 1988, Spanish heavy metal band Ángeles del Infierno included a cover of the song on their 1988 album 666.
- In 1990, Glam rock tribute band The Metal Gurus released a cover of the song as a B-Side for their single "Merry Xmas Everybody", another Slade cover. The single was produced by Holder and Lea, and reached No. 55 in the UK. Sales of the single raised proceeds for the Childline charity.
- In 1996, John Springate of glam rock group The Glitter Band released a cover on the glam rock tribute album Wham Bam Thank You Glam.
- In 1996, the English rockabilly band Big 6 released a cover of the track on the album Ready to Rock.
- In 1997, Welsh anti-fascist Oi! band The Oppressed included a cover of the song on their extended play "The Noise" which also featured covers of Slade's "Cum On Feel the Noize" and "Gudbuy T'Jane". The three covers were also included on the 1998 album More Noize for the Boys.
- In 2009, American ska punk band Reel Big Fish released a cover of the song on the album Fame, Fortune and Fornication.
