= Get Down and Get with It =

1964 song by Bobby Marchan

"Get Down and Get with It" is a song by American R&B singer-songwriter Bobby Marchan, first released as "Get Down with It" as the B-Side to his 1964 single "Half a Mind". In 1967, American singer Little Richard would record his own version, which was released as a single. In 1971, the British rock band Slade recorded a version of the song as "Get Down and Get with It", based on Little Richard's version, which gave the band their first UK chart hit.

== Slade version ==
"Get Down and Get with It"
- German cover of "Get Down and Get with It".

Single by Slade
- B-side: "Gospel According To Rasputin"; "Do You Want Me?"
- Released: 21 May 1971; August 1971 (US)
- Studio: Olympic Studios, Barnes, London
- Genre: Glam rock, proto-punk
- Length: 4:12
- Label: Polydor
- Songwriter: Bobby Marchan
- Producer: Chas Chandler

Slade singles chronology
"Know Who You Are" (1970)	"Get Down and Get with It" (1971)	"Coz I Luv You" (1971)

Official audio
- "Get Down and Get with It" on YouTube

Alternative Cover
- French cover of "Get Down and Get with It".

"Get Down and Get with It" was later covered by British rock band Slade. Released in 1971, the single was the band's first UK chart entry, reaching No. 16 and remaining in the charts for fourteen weeks. Slade's version was produced by Chas Chandler and would later appear on the band's 1973 compilation album Sladest.

=== Background ===
After the commercial failure of their 1970 album Play It Loud, Slade and their manager Chas Chandler began considering the band's next career move. They decided that the best way to make a commercial breakthrough would be to capture the band's strong reputation as a live act onto record. The chosen song was "Get Down and Get with It", which the band frequently played live to a great response. Released in May 1971, the song successfully broke the band into the UK and Europe. It reached No. 16 in the UK and would be the first of seventeen consecutive Top 20 hits for the band, which included six number ones.

Prior to recording the song in the studio, the band had established "Get Down and Get with It" as a popular number in their live-set, based on Little Richard's version. In the band's 1984 biography Feel the Noize!, Noddy Holder recalled: "The first time we heard that was at the Connaught in Wolverhampton and whenever the DJ used to play it, it went down a storm. We started doing it and the skinheads used to love that bit at the finish where you put your hands in the air and take your boots off and all that."

Impressed by the general audience reception of the song, Chandler suggested recording the song as a single. The band used Olympic Studios in Barnes, London to record it and Chandler told the band: "Just play it like you do on-stage. Blast it out like it's live, and pretend that there's an audience in there with you." Successfully recorded in a single take, the band included foot-stomping and hand-clapping in the recording to give the song a live feel. During a brief pause before one of the last verses, a voice can be heard whispering, 'Are you recording?'

The single was released twice during 1971; firstly on 21 May as "Get Down and Get with It" with writing credit for the song being given to the band and Little Richard. The band had believed the song to have been written by Little Richard. However, as the song started to climb the charts, publishers on behalf of Marchan soon got involved. The single was hurriedly re-issued as "Get Down with It" and correctly changed the writing credit to Marchan. In his 1999 biography Who's Crazee Now?, Holder recalled: "The record company sorted out the lawsuit, but we learnt to be more careful in future."

In 1990, Kiss AMC sampled a segment of the Slade Alive! version of the song for their single "My Docs", which featured an appearance from Holder in the music video. The song reached No. 66 in the UK.

=== Release ===
"Get Down and Get with It" was released on 7" vinyl by Polydor Records in the UK, Ireland, across Europe, Scandinavia, Australia, New Zealand, Mexico, Brazil and Argentina. In America, it was released by Cotillion. The B-sides, "Do You Want Me" and "Gospel According to Rasputin", would appear on certain editions of the band's 1972 European compilation Coz I Luv You. They were also included on the 2007 compilation B-Sides. For the UK and Ireland release, both B-sides were included on the single, while in most European countries, only "Gospel According to Rasputin" was included.

=== Promotion ===
A music video was filmed to promote the single, although it received few airings at the time. The black-and-white video was filmed by Caravelle. It featured Slade in the back of an open-roofed American car on the flyover roads in Central London. Arriving at a power station, the band climbs onto the roof, dances, and walks around, then returns to the car and drives off. In a 1973 interview with Music Star, guitarist Dave Hill recalled the making of the song's video in relation to his fear of heights: "I was wearing a silver suit so they decided to film me walking along an overhead ledge as though I were a spaceman who'd just landed. It was very high up and I suddenly looked down at the ground. That was a mistake because I just froze. I had this terror of falling, and I just froze completely, like a cat does when it gets stuck up a tree."

In the UK, the band performed the song on the music shows Top of the Pops and Whittaker's World of Music. In Belgium, they performed it on the TV show Popshop. In 1972, the band performed the song on 2Gs and the Pop People. A live performance of the song, recorded at the band's concert in Sydney, Australia, in 1973, was filmed for the Australian music TV show GTK.

=== Critical reception ===
Upon its release, Record Mirror said, "It's a scream-up of an adaptation of a Little Richard rocker, and there's a positive air of desperation as Noddy Holder builds up the excitement". Pete Butterfield of the Reading Evening Post called it "real down-to-earth rock 'n' roll in the Little Richard style with a heavy stomping beat". He continued, "If this record has anything to do with it, Slade will be accepted for what they are—a damn fine rock band. It's a real raver and should be a hit." In a retrospective review of the song, Dave Thompson of AllMusic wrote, "The [song] perfectly encapsulates the madness of a period Slade show, and the band's only complaint was that it wasn't half as heavy as it should have been. No matter, the stamping and clapping accompaniment became a Slade trademark regardless, while the record's overall aura of unrestrained power was simply too much for many radio DJs."

=== Track listing ===
7" single (UK only)

1. "Get Down and Get with It" – 4:12
2. "Do You Want Me" – 4:30
3. "Gospel According to Rasputin" – 4:23

7" single (Europe/Argentina release)

1. "Get Down and Get with It" – 4:12
2. "Gospel According to Rasputin" – 4:23

7" Single (US release)

1. "Get Down and Get with It" – 3:25
2. "Do You Want Me" – 4:30

7" single (US promo)

1. "Get Down and Get with It" – 3:25
2. "Get Down and Get with It" – 3:25

7" single (French release)

1. "Get Down and Get with It" – 4:12
2. "Know Who You Are" – 2:50

7" single (Mexican release)

1. "Get Down and Get with It" – 4:12
2. "Know Who You Are" – 2:50
3. "I Remember" – 2:55

7" single (Australian 1972 EP)

1. "Get Down and Get with It" – 4:12
2. "Look Wot You Dun" – 2:54
3. "Coz I Luv You" – 3:24
4. "Take Me Bak 'Ome" – 3:13

7" single (Brazilian 1972 EP)

1. "Get Down and Get with It" – 4:12
2. "Mama Weer All Crazee Now" – 3:45
3. "Cum On Feel the Noize" – 4:24
4. "Gudbuy T'Jane" – 3:33

=== Personnel ===
Slade

- Noddy Holder – lead vocals, rhythm guitar
- Dave Hill – lead guitar, backing vocals
- Jim Lea – bass, backing vocals
- Don Powell – drums

Additional personnel

- Chas Chandler – producer
- Zoot Money – piano

== Charts ==
Chart performance for "Get Down and Get with It"
Chart (1971)	Peak position
Australia (Kent Music Report)	78
Belgium (Ultratop 50 Flanders)	30
Belgium (Ultratop 50 Wallonia)	32
Netherlands (Dutch Top 40)	6
Netherlands (Single Top 100)	4
UK Singles (Official Charts)	16
West Germany (GfK)	34
