= British Rail Class 74 =

British locomotive

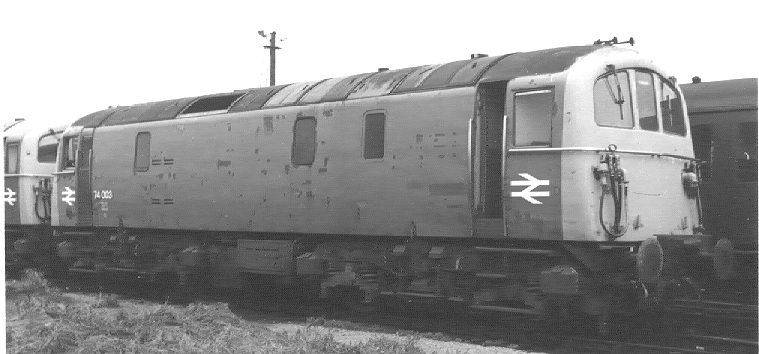
- 74003 in BR blue with full yellow ends
Type and origin
- Power type: Electro-diesel
- Builder: British Railways Doncaster Works
- Build date: 1958–1960
- Rebuilder: Crewe Works
- Rebuild date: 1967–1968
- Number rebuilt: 10
Specifications
- Configuration
  - AAR: B-B
  - UIC: Bo′Bo′
  - Commonwealth: Bo-Bo
- Gauge: 4 ft 8 1/2 in (1,435 mm) standard gauge
- Wheel diameter: 4 ft 0 in (1.22 m)
- Minimum curve: 264 ft 0 in (80.47 m)
- Wheelbase: Each bogie: 10 ft 6 in (3.20 m); Over bogie centres: 27 ft 0 in (8.23 m)
- Length: Over extended buffers: 50 ft 5 1/2 in (15.38 m)
- Width: 8 ft 11 in (2.72 m)
- Height: 13 ft 0 1/2 in (3.98 m)
- Loco weight: 77 long tons (78 t; 86 short tons)
- Fuel capacity: 280 imp gal (1,300 L)
- Electric system/s: 650–750 V DC third rail
- Current pickup: Contact shoe
- Prime mover: Paxman 6YJXL
- Engine type: 6-cylinder, 4-stroke
- Generator: English Electric EE843
- Traction motors: 4 × English Electric EE532A
  - Continuous: 3000 A total
- MU working: ★ Blue Star
- Train heating: Electric Train Heating (400 A max.)
- Train brakes: Air; Vacuum
Performance figures
- Maximum speed: 90 mph (140 km/h)
- Power output: Electric (continuous): 2,300 hp (1,715 kW); Electric (one-hour): 2,552 hp (1,903 kW); Engine: 650 bhp (485 kW)
- Tractive effort: On electric supply: 47,500 lbf (211.3 kN); On diesel engine: 40,000 lbf (177.9 kN)
Career
- Operators: British Railways
- Number in class: 10
- Numbers: E6101–E6110; later 74001–74010
- Axle load class: Route Availability 7
- Locale: BR Southern Region
- Withdrawn: 1976–1977
- Scrapped: 1977-1981
- Disposition: All scrapped

The British Rail Class 74 was a class of bi-mode electro-diesel locomotive that operated on the Southern Region of British Railways, rebuilt from redundant Class 71 locomotives in the late 1960s. All were withdrawn between June 1976 and December 1977, and scrapped between 1977 and 1981.

== History ==
Twenty-four British Rail Class 71 (pre-TOPS type HA) locomotives were built in 1958 at the British Rail works in Doncaster. Ten of these were deemed surplus to requirements and placed in storage in 1964. The work to convert these to electro-diesels was originally to have taken place at the Southern Region works at Eastleigh, but their involvement in new build EMUs for the Bournemouth electrification meant that Crewe Works was chosen for the rebuilds. The redundant HA locomotives were moved in groups to Crewe where they were rebuilt into type HB/Class 74 electro-diesels; the first rebuilt example working under its own power from Crewe to Stewarts Lane depot on 10 November 1967. Buckeye couplers and high-level, or "bagpipe", control and brake jumpers were fitted to facilitate working with other EP stock - especially TC units in push-pull mode. Also, two-tone "raspberry" air horns were mounted on the cab roof, replacing the original air whistle of Class 71 locomotives.

They were intended especially for use on the boat trains to Southampton and Weymouth, as both routes included sections of non-electrified track and tramway along the public thoroughfare. The elimination of the locomotive change (at either Eastleigh (for Southampton) or Bournemouth) was envisaged and their dual power capability would greatly accelerate timings and reduce operational complexity.

Originally, plans had been to number them E7001–E7010, but once rebuilt they were numbered E6101–E6110 instead. Later they were given TOPS numbers 74001–74010.

== Power supply ==
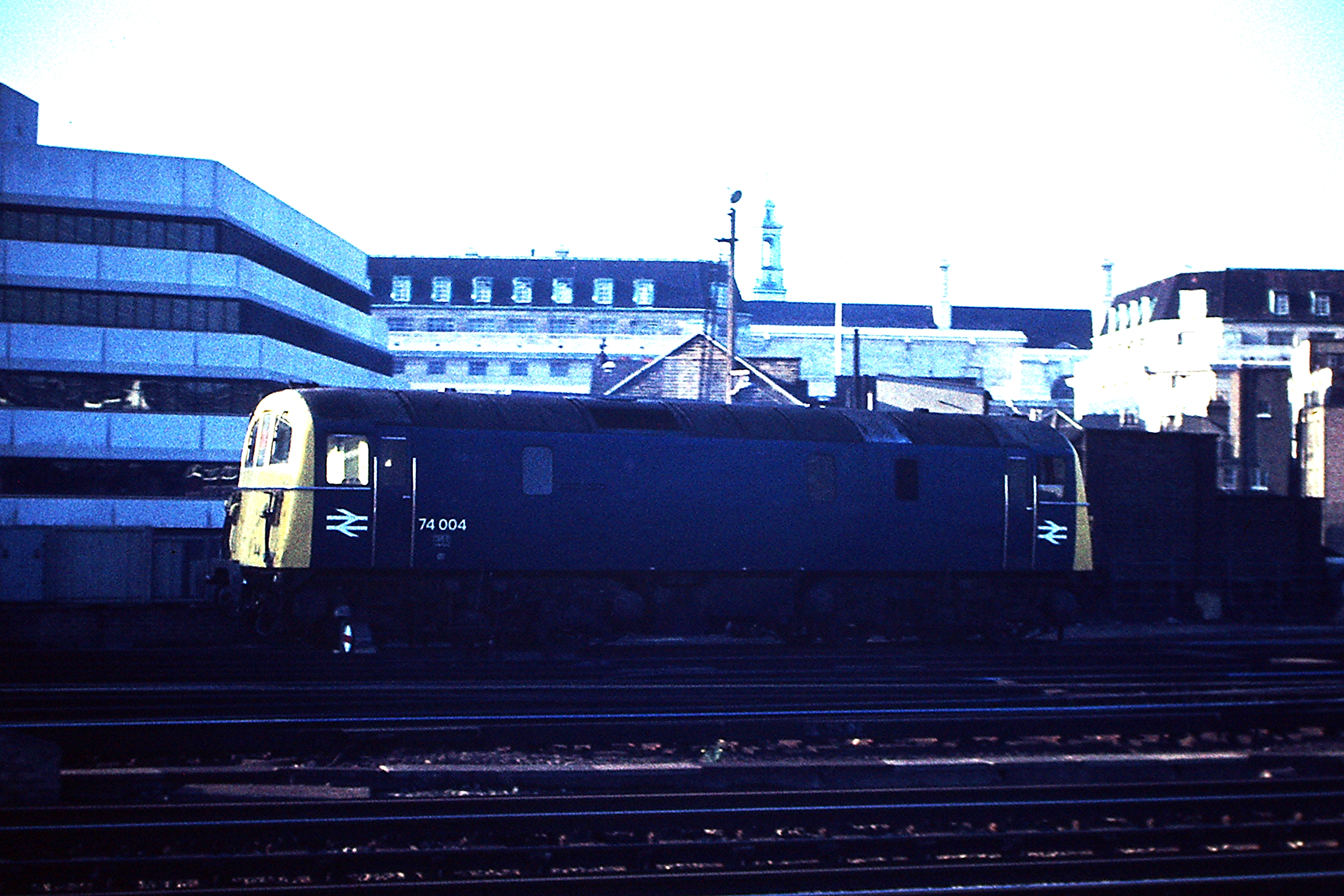
74004 at Waterloo in 1975.

In common with the first SR DC electric locomotives (Class 70), Class 74 utilised a booster set (a motor-generator and flywheel combination) to overcome the problem of gapping. Booster set 836/2D had been designed by English Electric for use in Class 71 and this was retained in the rebuild, although weight considerations meant that the flywheel assembly, separate auxiliary generator and traction motor blowers were removed (the latter leading to the decision to downrate the traction motors). The compact size of the booster permitted a small diesel engine and generator inside the body shell (only a single booster was used in Classes 71 & 74 unlike the two of Class 70). Thus, these locomotives could operate either from a third rail supply at 650 V DC (Eastern & Central sections), 750 V DC (Western section) or from their Paxman 6YJXL 'Ventura' diesel engine, downrated to 650 hp in order to extend service intervals. BR already had 77 locomotives using this model of engine; 57 Class 14s and a further 20 Class 29s. The Class 71's pantograph for overhead current collection was not retained.

== Complications with rebuild ==
The bodies of Class 71 locomotives were not designed to be structural components capable of carrying any weight, following the principle of earlier designs in that the underframe was the main structural member of the locomotive while the body served primarily as weatherproofing. In August 1966, after initial strip-down and examination of E5016, engineers were forced to re-assess the build when it became apparent that the planned equipment changes could not be accommodated. Although at one point it was mooted that the body would have to be divided and lengthened, the problem was eventually resolved by rebuilding the bodies with a Warren truss framework and outriggers to support the curved body skin. Translucent roof panels were fitted to increase daytime illumination in the engine room. Modifications were also made to the locations of the cooler groups, water tanks, and exhaust silencer.

== Electronic traction control ==
Obtaining a DC supply controlled by rectifiers requires an AC power source. Consequently, the existing auxiliary generator was converted to a three-phase alternator with automatic voltage regulator. This arrangement gives improved control of traction current over conventional rheostatic systems and permits fine control when starting a train. The system also functioned as a form of wheel slip protection by regulating traction current voltage and supply across all the locomotive's traction motors at once. Normally a driver has to maintain tractive effort well below the rail adhesion limit to give themselves time to respond to wheel slip. The constant current systems of Class 74 were designed to allow the driver to apply power very near the limit of adhesion and the booster output is regulated in such a way that the maximum current of any traction motor group does not exceed the selected value. Thus, even when one axle starts slipping, the voltage across the whole group of motors cannot rise because current in the non-slipping motors is fixed. As one motor begins to slip, its current consumption drops (electric motors use greatest current when stalled and least while free-running) which provides more current for the non-slipping motor. The voltage drops proportionately and the slipping motor – now partly deprived of power – begins to slow, which stops the slipping and returns the traction system to the state it was in before slip set in; thus torque can be maintained at a point just below friction break-away.

The power controller, though capable of infinite variability, was notched so that Class 74 locomotives could work with Class 73/1s and any electro-pneumatically controlled ('Blue Star' coupling code) Type 2, 3, or 4 diesel locomotive. Two constant voltage notches were provided for slow-speed control of shunting and coupling-up. Three further notches spaced out over the power range corresponded to the 'Series, Parallel, Weak-Field' (2, 3 & 4) progression used on power controllers for multiple-unit stock.

Control equipment was designed on the 'Line Replaceable Unit' (LRU) ethos and consisted of 'trays' of circuit boards and equipment arranged in two cabinets. The first contained the usual circuit breakers, relays, reversers, and so forth. The second also housed standard equipment but additionally included the complex electronic control circuits that ultimately were the un-doing of the class. The equipment trays were equipped with test connectors and could be slid into and out of the relevant cabinet with ease when the locomotive was shut down. Maintenance staff were provided with testing units that would connect to the trays and compare the electrical signals and stimuli on the test socket with the design values. If any anomaly was detected, the whole tray was replaced and the locomotive could – in theory – be returned to service with minimal disruption. The theory, however, did not fully account for the fact that faults in one tray might only present themselves in combination with faults on other trays, which sometimes lead to locomotives being kept out of service for long periods of time while in-depth investigations were undertaken.

Nevertheless, advances in power control technology – particularly solid-state electronics – allowed similar arrangements to be adopted reliably by other manufacturers and operators within ten years' time.

== Operations ==
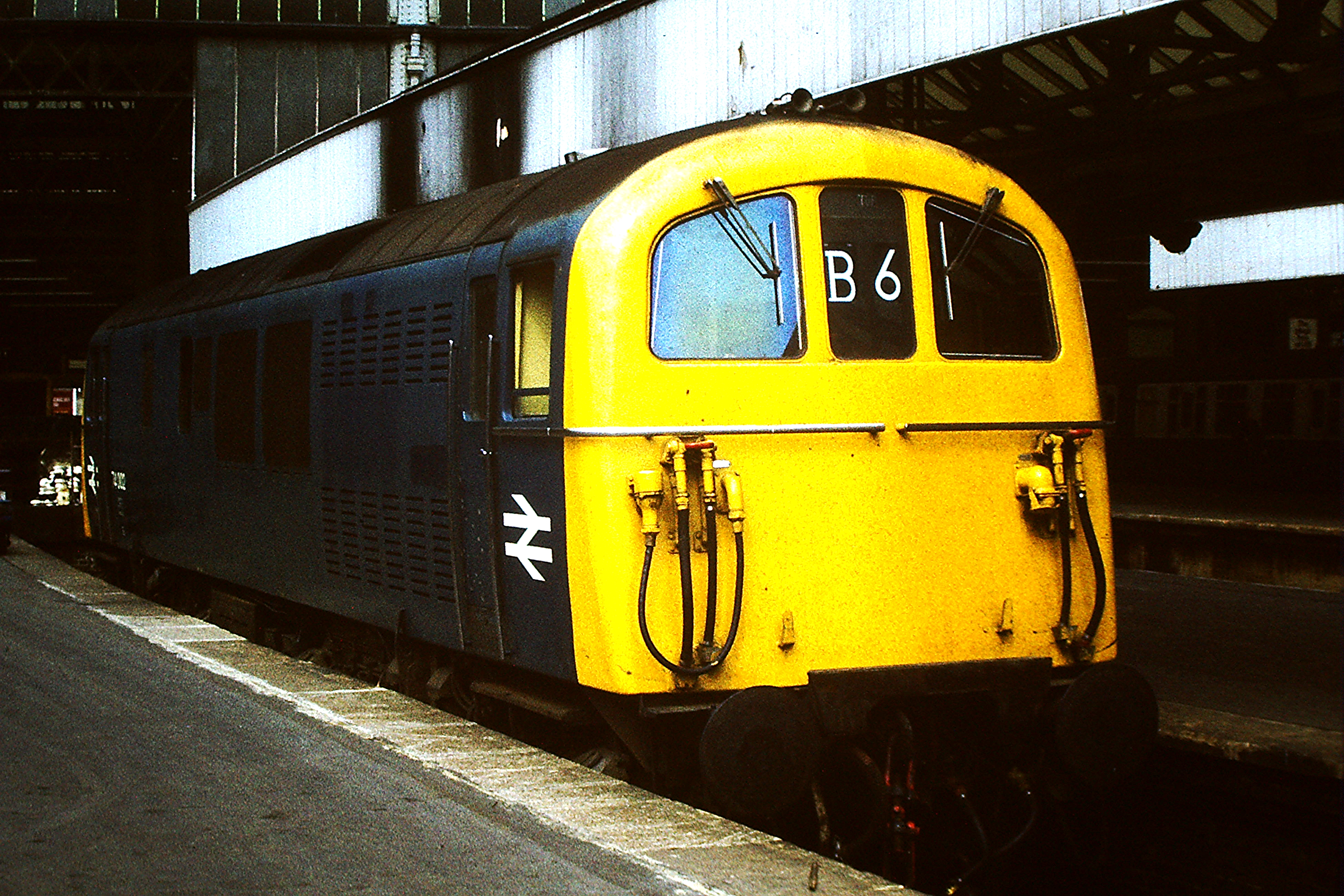
74 002 at Waterloo

The Paxman engine of Class 74 was marginally more powerful than Class 73's English Electric engine, but significantly less reliable. The Paxman was also noisy (due to the silencer being mounted in the roof very near the cab) and difficult to start on occasion, which reduced flexibility. Until four additional 4-REP units were built in 1973 and 1974, Class 74 locomotives operated regular daytime passenger turns including Waterloo–Weymouth services as far as Bournemouth. Subsequently, their only regular non-freight workings were on night mail and newspaper trains to and from Bournemouth, the Weymouth boat trains, and Southampton 'Ocean Liner Specials'. These trains ran to/from both Southampton Western and Eastern Docks.

In practice, Class 74s were a rare visitor to Weymouth because failures while running on diesel were common and disruptive, and they were usually replaced on Weymouth trains at Bournemouth by Class 33 diesels for the final leg of the journey. This continuing unreliability bred mistrust of the class within BR, negating the point of acquiring them as higher-power diesels. They did remain in frequent use on services to Southampton Ocean terminal, but as this required only a few miles of diesel-powered running – and on a branch line rather than a main – the potential for disruption to other services was reduced. These problems were compounded by the difficulties faced in maintaining the locomotives' control systems, which were both more complicated and less reliable than those fitted to the Class 73 fleet, and Class 74s came to be unpopular with crew and fitters alike.

When in good order they were judged to be sprightly performers, and the electronic traction control meant that acceleration was equally solid on both diesel and electric power sources. When running on the diesel engine, however, available power was pretty much exhausted by the time 60 or 70 miles per hour (97 or 113 km/h) was reached even when hauling 'normal' loads – as after losses and auxiliary loads were considered the engine's continuous at-rail power output topped out at only 315 hp (235 kW).

They were regular visitors to the London area, often running on London Midland Region and Western Region tracks. In the early half of the 1970s, milk trains for the Southern Region were a staple for the class as far as Acton Yard, requiring diesel power from Clapham Junction through Kensington and onto the Western Region mainline.

Although their multiple-working abilities allowed them to work with other locomotives of Classes 73 and 74, EP multiple unit stock, and any Blue Star fitted mainline diesel locomotive, multiple operations were exceptionally rare other than on the frequent balancing runs between their home depot of Eastleigh and their day-time out-stations of either Clapham Junction yard or Stewarts Lane depot, in readiness for night-time postal and newspaper trains from London Waterloo. These were nearly always pairs running light-engine or occasionally combined with empty coaching stock (ECS) moves.

The entire class was allocated to Eastleigh depot for their operational life. In common with Class 73, Class 74 locomotives were sent to Crewe Electric TMD for heavy maintenance up until 1972, after which Eastleigh took over all works for both classes.

== Withdrawal ==
In 1976, the first example was withdrawn: 74006 (originally E6106) was damaged by fire and judged to be beyond economical repair.

By the mid-1970s, electronics technology had advanced sufficiently that the fleet's unreliable electronic systems could potentially have been upgraded or even replaced entirely; something that British Rail had recently demonstrated a willingness to do with the AC electric locomotives of Classes 82, 83, and 84. However, while the AC locomotives were needed to cover services on newly electrified sections of the West Coast Main Line, the work for which the Class 74 fleet had been built was drying up. Boat trains were greatly reduced in number, and many of those that remained had switched to being worked by multiple units. Freight and parcels demand on the Southern Region was also contracting. In July 1977, 74002 was withdrawn following a collision, and the following month BR decided not to repair 74009 after it suffered a failure. The remaining seven members of the class were withdrawn en masse on 31 December 1977, whereupon they languished at Eastleigh depot for a period of many months before being sent for scrap. The final extant locomotive, 74005, was scrapped at Fratton Traincare Depot near Portsmouth in January 1981.

Locomotive 74010 was given a brief reprieve so that it could be for evaluated for departmental use by the Railway Technical Centre in Derby. It was given a light overhaul at Eastleigh before being towed to Derby, where it was eventually deemed to be unsuitable and subsequently scrapped at Doncaster Works in 1979.

== Fleet ==
Table of locomotives:
Type HB	Date rebuilt	Rebuilt from HA	TOPS	Date withdrawn	Date scrapped	Location of scrapping	Notes
E6101	Feb 1968	E5015	74001	Dec 1977	Aug 1978	Birds, Long Marston	
E6102	Nov 1967	E5016	74002	Jun 1977	Dec 1977	John Cashmore Ltd, Newport	Withdrawn due to collision damage
E6103	Dec 1967	E5006	74003	Dec 1977	Dec 1980	John Cashmore Ltd, Newport	
E6104	Feb 1968	E5024	74004	Dec 1977	Aug 1978	Birds, Long Marston	Originally E5000
E6105	Feb 1968	E5019	74005	Dec 1977	Jan 1981	Pounds, at Fratton Traincare Depot	
E6106	Mar 1968	E5023	74006	Jun 1976	Jul 1977	G Cohen, Kettering	Withdrawn due to fire damage
E6107	Mar 1968	E5003	74007	Dec 1977	Aug 1978	Birds, Long Marston	
E6108	Apr 1968	E5005	74008	Dec 1977	Aug 1978	Birds, Long Marston	
E6109	Apr 1968	E5017	74009	Dec 1977	Aug 1978	Birds, Long Marston	
E6110	May 1968	E5021	74010	Dec 1977	Oct 1979	Doncaster Works	

== Models ==
Worsley Works manufacture a nickel-silver body kit (as an aid to scratch-building) in a variety of scales from 2 mm to 4 mm.

Silver Fox Models manufactures a 4 mm resin body kit to mount on a donor chassis, with the option to purchase a ready-to-run version.

In early 2026 bachmann released a 4mm OO Gauge ready to run model of the class under the EFE rail banner. Models have been released in BR Blue with both pre and post-tops numbering.
