= HMS Richmond helicopter crash =

2002 aviation accident

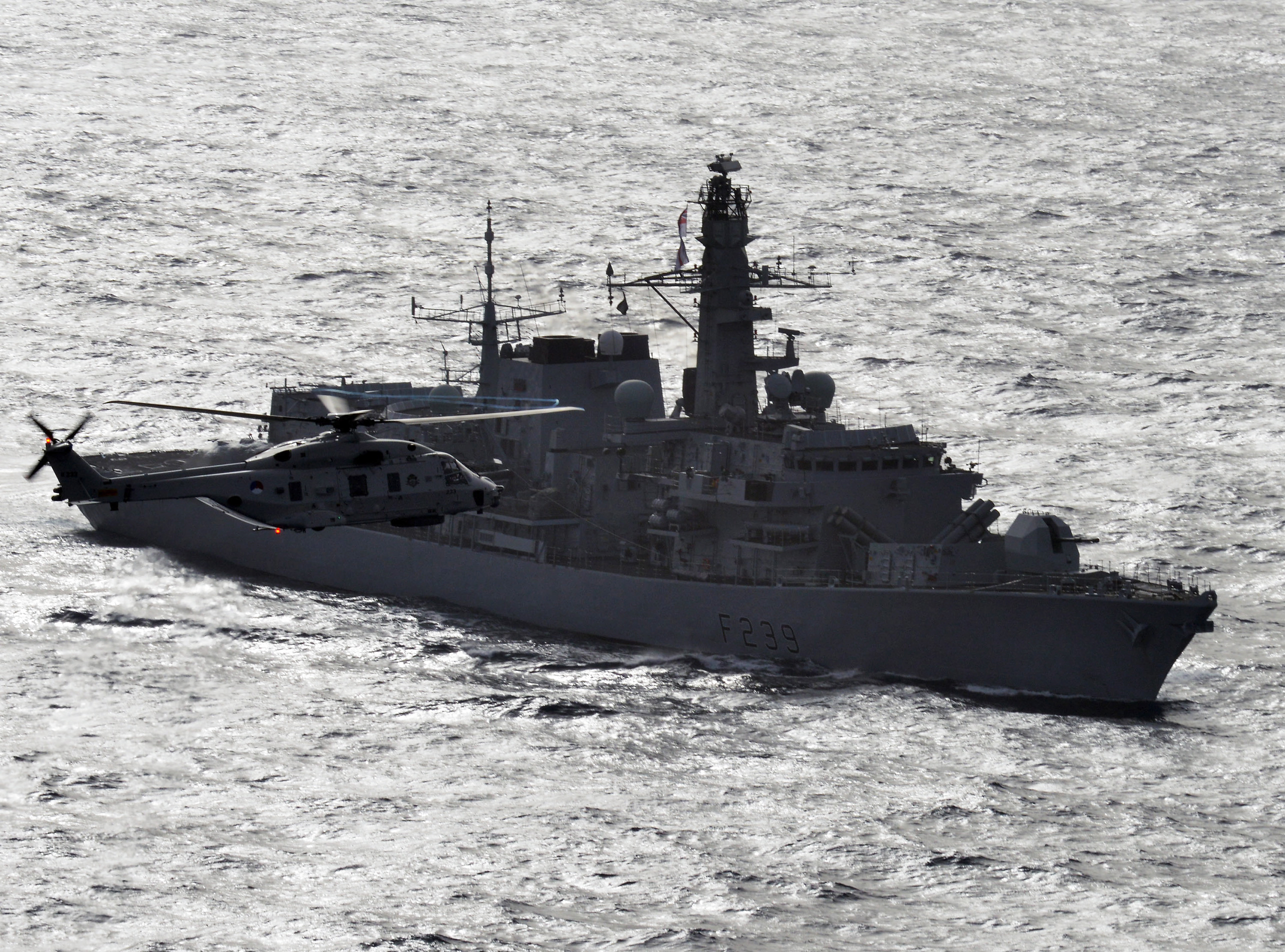
- Helicopter-borne operations from HMS Richmond in 2013

Accident
- Date: 12 June 2002
- Summary: Aircraft lost at sea
- Site: Atlantic Ocean, 200 miles off the coast of Virginia; 35°N 73.5°W

Aircraft
- Aircraft type: Westland Lynx
- Operator: Royal Navy
- Registration: XZ256
- Destination: HMS Richmond
- Passengers: 1
- Crew: 2
- Fatalities: 2
- Injuries: 1
- Survivors: 1

The Westland Lynx helicopter attached to the Royal Navy frigate HMS Richmond crashed into the Atlantic Ocean on 12 June 2002, killing two of the three on board. It had been returning to the ship after an air-to-ship missile live firing exercise, when it suffered a double engine failure.

The two fatalities were Lieutenants Rod Skidmore and Jenny Lewis, the pilot and observer seated in the two-person cockpit; Lewis is believed to be the first female Royal Navy pilot or observer to die in service. A third crew member, Petty Officer Paul Hanson, survived after being rescued. He had been on board to record the exercise.

The helicopter went down approximately 200 miles off the eastern seaboard of the United States, necessitating the deepest salvage operation ever undertaken by the Ministry of Defence. Both the wreckage and the body of Skidmore were recovered, but Lewis's body was never found, leading the coroner to express regret that he was only permitted in law to record a verdict on Skidmore, of accidental death.

== Aircraft ==
The aircraft involved in the incident was a Lynx helicopter, which was from RNAS Yeovilton, Somerset. The 15-year-old Mark 8 Lynx was serial No. XZ256, at the time flying from the Type 23 frigate HMS Richmond. Both XZ256 and Lieutenants Skidmore and Lewis were assigned to 815 Naval Air Squadron, based at RNAS Yeovilton in Somerset.

== Crash and rescue ==
On 12 June 2002, HMS Richmond was participating in a training exercise with the U.S. Navy to test Sea Skua and Tomahawk missiles by firing them from a Lynx helicopter at a disused American warship at the Virginia Cape range.

The Lynx helicopter attached to Richmond was being piloted by Lieutenant Rod Skidmore, 39, a British citizen and married father of two from Martinstown, Dorset. The flight observer was Lieutenant Jenny Lewis, 25, also a British citizen and one of three women in the forty-strong 815 Naval Air Squadron. Lewis had been in the Navy for four years, previously serving on HMS London and HMS Northumberland. Her family was from the Isle of Wight, and she lived in Sherborne. Also on board was Paul Hanson, a petty officer working as a photographer, from St Helens, Merseyside. He was on board to video record the launch of the missiles and the damage that they caused.

Whilst returning to Richmond in fair weather, Lewis made an emergency call at low altitude around 40 miles (64 km) from the ship. As stated at the later inquest, Hanson heard a bang from the starboard engine, after which the helicopter nosedived into the Atlantic Ocean from a height of around 400 feet (120 m). The crash occurred 190 miles (310 km) southeast of the US naval base at Norfolk, Virginia. A door of the helicopter was ripped off during the crash, which allowed Hanson to swim free of the craft as it started to sink. He suffered only minor injuries, while Lewis and Skidmore were killed. Five weeks later it was found that Hanson had suffered from two crushed vertebrae.

Following the accident, Hanson said that he could see his fellow crew-members in the water as well, as "there were two green helmets, they were no more than 50 or 60 feet away from me.", but after he swam to them he found that they were just empty floating helmets.

The wreck subsequently sank to 4,000 metres (13,000 ft), as deep as Titanic, with very little debris left on the surface.

In the aftermath of the crash, a joint search and rescue operation was launched by British and American authorities but was called off at sunset, with only Hanson being rescued. The crew of HMS Richmond held a memorial service on 13 June near the last reported position of the helicopter, including throwing a white Royal Navy ensign into the sea at the position.

== Salvage operation and crash investigation ==
Initial reports were that the craft had suffered double engine failure. The MoD stated that there were no safety issues known with the Lynx at the time of the accident. A Royal Navy board of inquiry was convened to investigate the crash, and British investigators flew to the US later in the week of the accident to interview Hanson and other involved people.

Lewis was "the first female Lynx helicopter aircrew" and the first female pilot or observer to die while serving with the Royal Navy.

The crash raised questions about the airworthiness of the helicopters, following from their grounding two years earlier from operational stress suffered by the core of the rotor blades, although the accident wasn't linked to that defect.

It was initially reported that the crashed helicopter would not be recovered. However, MOD Salvage and Marine Operations (SALMO) Project Team later recovered the helicopter. At its depth of 4,000 metres (13,000 ft) this made it the deepest ever recovery of a crashed aircraft. After recovery, the wreckage was transferred to the Flight Safety & Accident Investigation Centre at Yeovilton. The recovery enabled the accident investigators to identify a potentially serious defect with the aircraft, which was fixed immediately throughout the rest of the helicopter fleet.

Skidmore's body was later recovered from the ocean, but Lewis's body was never recovered.

The inquest into Skidmore's death, held in Dorchester on 25 June 2003, reached a verdict of accidental death for Skidmore. Coroner Michael Johnston explained that he was prevented by law from holding an inquest into Lewis's death as her body was not recovered, despite involving exactly the same circumstances - a situation he criticised while apologising to Lewis' mother.

At the inquest, Hanson said that he thought that one of the engines had caught fire.

== Locomotive D6515 dedication ==
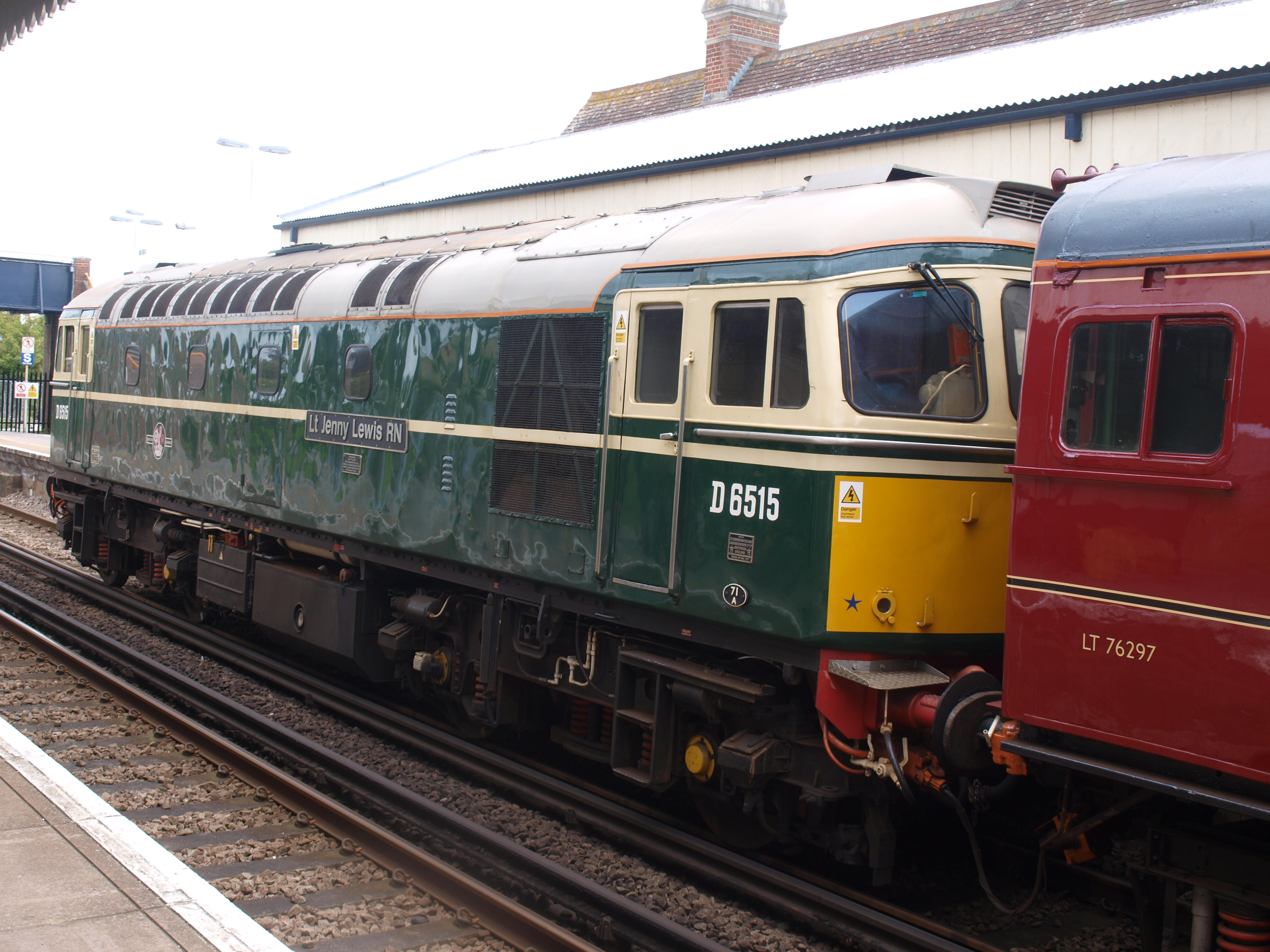
D6515 at Wareham in 2017

On 12 June 2014, 12 years to the day after the crash, Lewis's death was commemorated by a flypast over Swanage station by a Lynx from RNAS Yeovilton, and the renaming of the preserved British Rail Class 33 diesel-electric locomotive No. D6515 to Lt Jenny Lewis RN. Lewis was a fan of the class. The locomotive was used to haul trains between London and Corfe Castle and Swanage in 1966, and the 77-tonne locomotive was recently overhauled to mainline standards. Lewis's father became a major shareholder in the overhaul project after her death.
