= British Rail Class 71 =

Class of electric locomotives

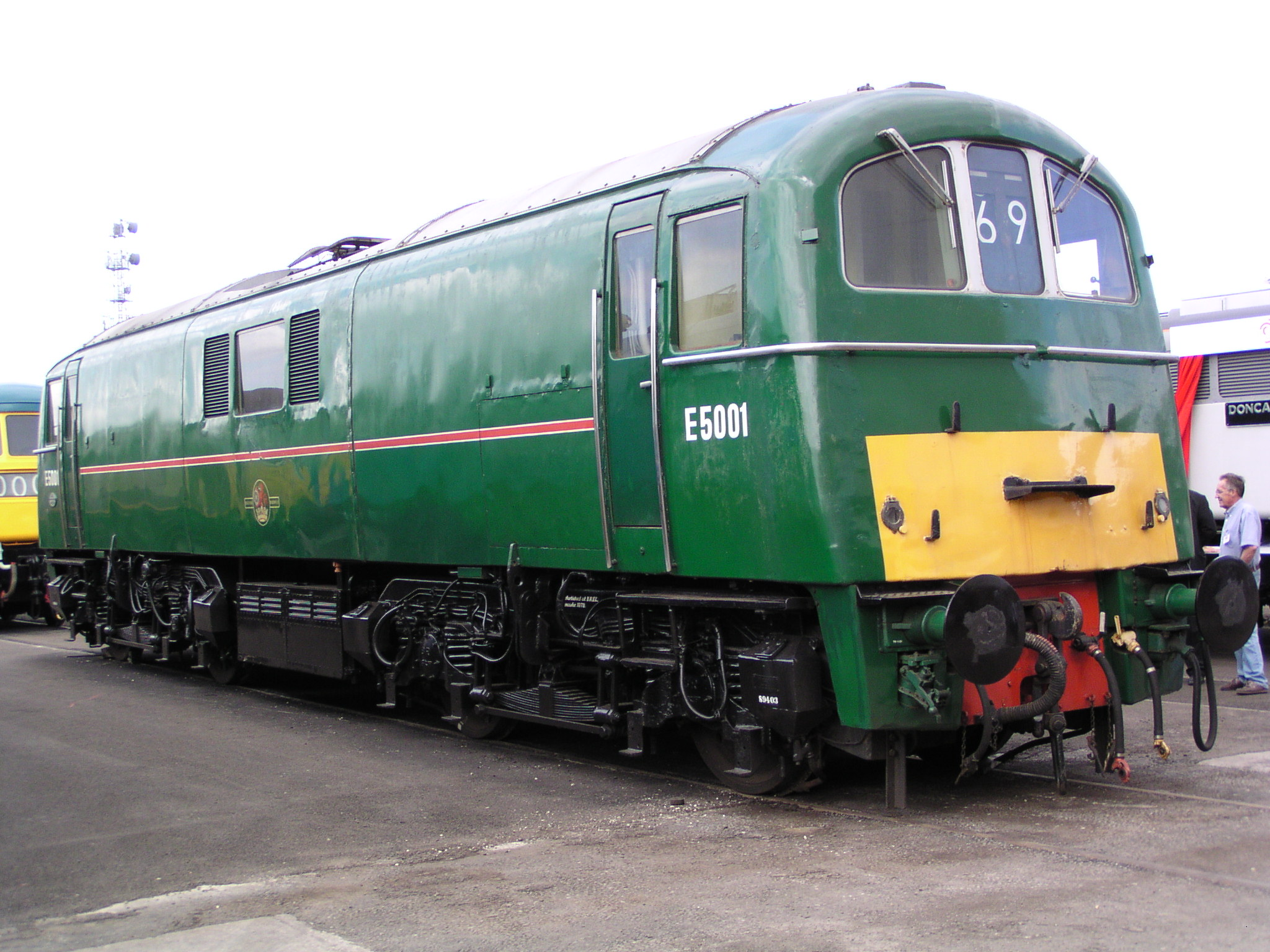
- E5001 at Doncaster Works.
Type and origin
- Power type: Electric
- Builder: British Railways’ Doncaster Works
- Order number: Doncaster EO3 (3), EO4 (10), EO15 (11)
- Build date: 1958–1960
- Total produced: 24
Specifications
- Configuration
  - AAR: B-B
  - UIC: Bo′Bo′
  - Commonwealth: Bo-Bo
- Gauge: 4 ft 8 1/2 in (1,435 mm)
- Wheel diameter: 4 ft 0 in (1,219 mm)
- Loco weight: 77.00 long tons (78.24 t; 86.24 short tons)
- Electric system/s: 660–750 V DC Third rail (mainline); 650 V DC Overhead Line (sidings)
- Current pickups: Contact shoe (mainline); Pantograph (sidings)
- Traction motors: English Electric 532 or 532A, 4 off
- Train heating: Electric Train Heating
- Loco brake: Dual Vacuum and Air
Performance figures
- Maximum speed: 90 mph (145 km/h)
- Power output
  - 1 hour: 2,552 hp (1,900 kW)
  - Continuous: 2,300 hp (1,720 kW)
- Tractive effort: 43,800 lbf (195 kN)
- Brakeforce: 68 long tons-force (678 kN)
Career
- Operators: British Railways
- Numbers: E5000–E5023; later E5001–E5024; later 71 001–71 014
- Axle load class: Route availability 6
- Withdrawn: 1976–1977
- Preserved: E5001
- Current owner: National Railway Museum
- Disposition: 10 rebuilt to class 74, 13 scrapped, 1 preserved

The British Rail Class 71 is an electric locomotive that was used on the Southern Region of British Railways. Unlike Southern Region electro-diesel locomotives (such as classes 73 and 74) they could not operate away from the electrified (750 V DC) system.

== History ==
As part of the British Transport Commission's Modernisation Plan of 1955, twenty-four electric locomotives were built in 1958 for the Kent Coast main lines. They were built at the British Rail workshops in Doncaster. Numbers were originally E5000–E5023 but the first locomotive, E5000, was renumbered E5024 in December 1962. They were classified type HA under the Southern Region's pre-TOPS scheme.

== Power supply ==
Power collection was from a 3rd rail at 650V DC (Eastern & Central sections) or 750V DC (Western section) and control was by flywheel booster, as in British Rail Class 70. In some yards (notably Hither Green, South East London and Snowdown colliery near Dover) overhead wiring energised to 650V DC was used. This overhead collection method was only employed where it was deemed too dangerous to have an electrified third rail, with staff constantly at ground level reaching between vehicles to couple and uncouple trains. The overhead system utilised tram-style contact wires and pantographs – it was not necessary to collect traction current at speed and these provided a cost saving. The pantograph retracted into a cut-out recess in the roof when not in use, to keep within the loading gauge. Certain examples were delivered new without pantographs and ran with the recess vacant for some time. Evidently supply of the overhead equipment was short. Later in life (when the wiring in yards had almost completely been removed) during overhaul the opportunity was taken, on some examples of the class, to remove the sometimes-troublesome pantograph, leading again to a vacant roof recess.

The danger of electrocution of staff at track level was the entire tenet behind the Southern Region/Railway adopting the high-level brake pipes and control jumpers (nicknamed "bagpipes") that are so distinctive of SR stock. Low-level brake pipes were still fitted to maintain standards, but only used when high-level could not be. However Class 71 was not fitted with high-level jumpers. Ten redundant locos were modified to become Class 74 – emerging from Crewe works with "bagpipes" – in 1967/8. However 19 members of Class 33 (a pure diesel locomotive), which were modified at Eastleigh for push-pull operation of Southern Region TC units, were so fitted, along with nearly all SR-based members of shunting classes 03 and 08. In contrast almost all other contemporary locomotive classes (excepting notably classes 07, 09, 73 – all SR locomotives) had the multiple control jumpers and brake connectors on or under the buffer beam - a perilous place to be with 750 volts just inches away. Despite overhead equipment being confined to just a handful of yards, Class 71 was never retro-fitted with high-level connectors.

== Operations ==
They were mixed-traffic locomotives. Their 2300/2552 hp was, for a small Bo-Bo locomotive, useful for both heavy freight and express passenger work. Acceleration on passenger trains (even when heavily loaded) was quite astonishing – to the extent that the climb out of London Victoria was almost unnoticeable. Prestigious services, including the heavy "Night Ferry" (London to Paris overnight by train-ferry) and the "Golden Arrow", the latter a Pullman service, were a mainstay of the class for many years.

Reliability of the class as a whole was good. As more areas of the Eastern section were given over to multiple unit (EMU) operation, however, the class found itself ousted almost completely from passenger work. During their later years their passenger duties were only the 'Night Ferry' and the nightly Victoria–Dover/Ramsgate newspaper train. Even this latter was rostered for a Class 33 (diesel locomotive) on Saturday nights, due to the probability of engineering works en route.

Their reliance on the electricity supply proved a hindrance. Much freight is moved overnight, when congestion on the busy commuter corridors is low; but this is also the time when engineering possessions of the track take place, the power being switched off to whole districts while this happens. Class 71 was therefore faced with frequent circuitous detours purely to stay "on the juice". An electric-only locomotive was also limited in scope for inter-regional freights. The flywheel booster allowed the locomotives to make short movements "off the juice" – in yards and depots for example – but not for significant distances. The smaller Class 73 electro-diesel locomotives deputised for them with ease (albeit often in pairs) and they had the ability to work lines when the power was off, and to run (at reduced power) on other regions where there was no third rail electricity supply. Class 71 was beginning to look (once again – see Class 74) like a white elephant. When the end came, most were scrapped in full working order, purely because they had no work.

A single member of the class, E5001, survives in preservation, in full working order (although currently minus its 3rd rail collector shoes). As with the remainder of the class, the preserved example never received the standard SR horns, retaining its air whistles right up until withdrawal.

== Rebuilds and renumberings ==
By the late 1960s there was less work for the class, and several members were placed in store. Ten examples were eventually converted between 1967 and 1968 at the British Rail workshops in Crewe into electro-diesel locomotives. They were originally assigned the numbers E7001–E7010 but were numbered E6101–E6110 and classified type HB in the pre-TOPS scheme. Under TOPS the rebuilt ten became Class 74.

As a result of the rebuilds there were three renumberings from the remaining Class 71s (E5018, E5020 and E5022) to fill the gaps that were left by rebuilding of original locomotives E5003, E5005 and E5006.

The remaining fourteen became Class 71, numbered 71001 to 71014 under the TOPS scheme.

== The end ==
The class survived relatively unscathed with no members being scrapped early. Two were awaiting repair at Ashford due to failures and the end finally came on the last day of 1977 when all 14 members were withdrawn en bloc as a result of motive power rationalisation. Their rostered duties were turned over to Class 73 electro-diesels as part of a new timetable and better use of that class.

== Preservation ==
The one preserved example (erstwhile 71 001) was saved by the National Railway Museum in York (currently on display at NRM Shildon) and has been restored as E5001.

Table of locomotives
Type HA	Renumbered	Date renumbered	TOPS No.	Date withdrawn	Notes
E5000	E5024	Dec 1962	—	Feb 1968	Rebuilt as Class 74 E6104
E5001	—	—	71 001	Nov 1977	Preserved
E5002	—	—	71 002	Nov 1977	
E5003	—	—	—	Mar 1968	Rebuilt as Class 74 E6107
E5004	—	—	71 004	Nov 1977	
E5005	—	—	—	Apr 1968	Rebuilt as Class 74 E6108
E5006	—	—	—	Dec 1967	Rebuilt as Class 74 E6103
E5007	—	—	71 007	Nov 1977	
E5008	—	—	71 008	Nov 1977	
E5009	—	—	71 009	Nov 1977	
E5010	—	—	71 010	Nov 1977	
E5011	—	—	71 011	Nov 1977	
E5012	—	—	71 012	Nov 1977	
E5013	—	—	71 013	Nov 1977	
E5014	—	—	71 014	Nov 1977	
E5015	—	—	—	Feb 1968	Rebuilt as Class 74 E6101
E5016	—	—	—	Nov 1967	Rebuilt as Class 74 E6102
E5017	—	—	—	Apr 1968	Rebuilt as Class 74 E6109
E5018	E5003	Dec 1968	71 003	Nov 1977	
E5019	—	—	—	Feb 1968	Rebuilt as Class 74 E6105
E5020	E5005	Sep 1968	71 005	Nov 1977	
E5021	—	—	—	May 1968	Rebuilt as Class 74 E6110
E5022	E5006	Sep 1968	71 006	Nov 1977	
E5023	—	—	—	Mar 1968	Rebuilt as Class 74 E6106

== Models ==
Having previously been made as ready-to-run by Golden Arrow Models of Hastings (OO gauge) and in kit form by MTK (Modern Traction Kits) thence DC Kits of Leeds (4mm /OO gauge) the HA /class 71 was also produced as both a kit and ready-to-run model (OO gauge) by Silver Fox Models

In July 2016 Hornby released three versions of the HA /class 71 (all with working pantograph); these being E5001 (green, red stripes post-1963 rainstrips and with small warning panel), 71 012 (blue full yellow ends), E5022 (green, red stripes and without yellow warning panels or post-1963 rainstrips). A further version was produced exclusively for the NRM, this being E5001 (green, red stripe, post-1963 rainstrips but without yellow warning panels). More versions are expected in 2017. In May 2017 DJ Models released its versions of the HA /class 71 in OO gauge with multiple versions becoming available. However, with the demise of the company in 2019, no more will be forthcoming.
