= British Rail Class 33 =

Class of 98 Bo′Bo′ 1550hp diesel-electric locomotives

BRCW Type 3 British Rail Class 33
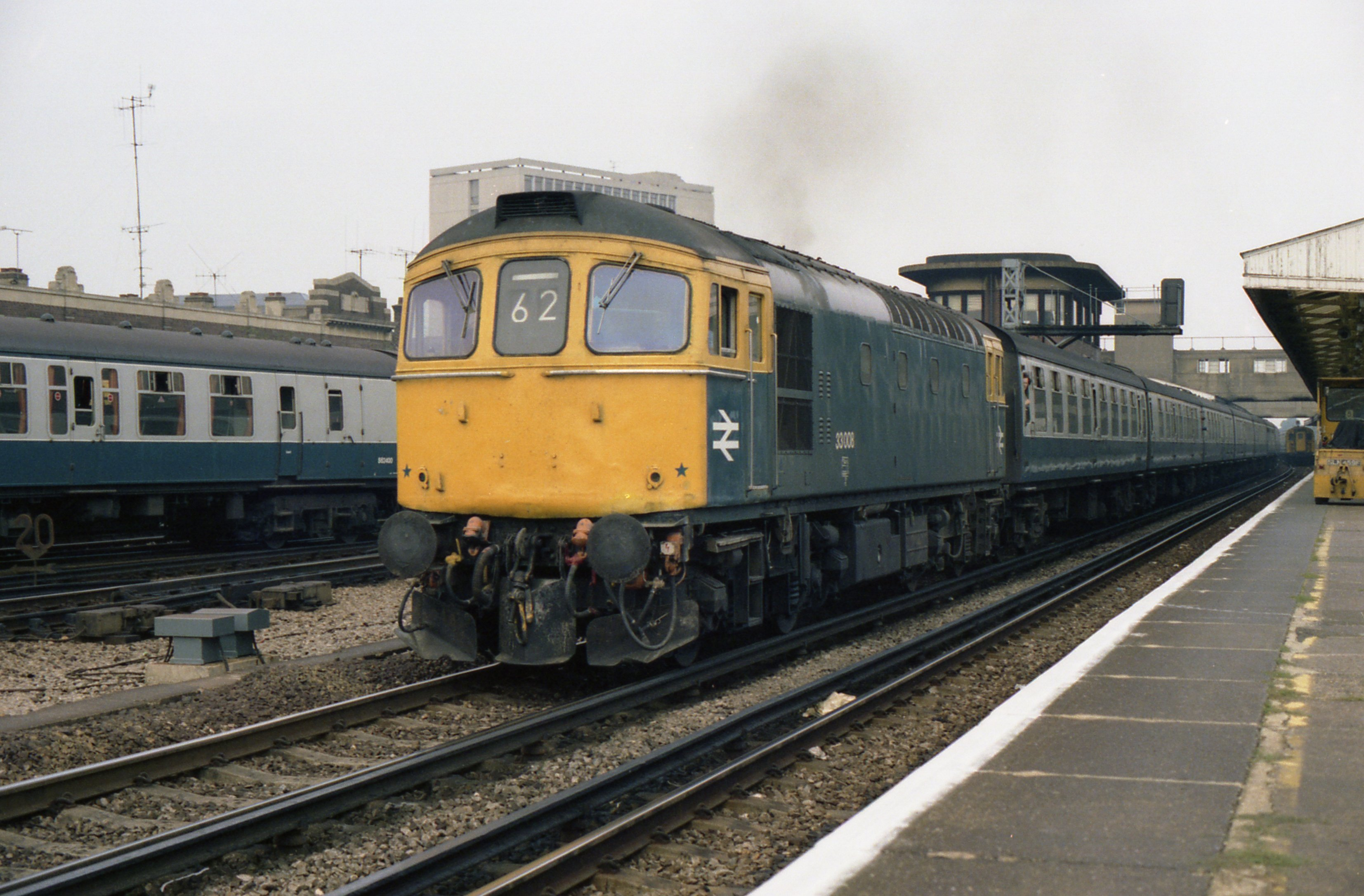
- A Class 33 at Woking, c. 1978
Type and origin
- Power type: Diesel-electric
- Builder: Birmingham Railway Carriage and Wagon Company
- Serial number: DEL92–DEL156, DEL169-DEL189, DEL157-DEL168
- Build date: 1960–1962
- Total produced: 98
Specifications
- Configuration
  - UIC: Bo′Bo′
  - Commonwealth: Bo-Bo
- Gauge: 4 ft 8 1/2 in (1,435 mm) standard gauge
- Wheel diameter: 3 ft 7 in (1,090 mm)
- Minimum curve: 4 chains (80.47 m)
- Wheelbase: 39 ft 0 in (11.89 m)
  - Bogie: 10 ft 0 in (3.05 m)
- Length: 50 ft 9 in (15.47 m)
- Width: Class 33/0 and 33/1: 9 ft 3 in (2.82 m); Class 33/2: 8 ft 8 in (2.64 m)
- Height: 12 ft 8 in (3.86 m)
- Loco weight: Class 33/0 – 73.8 long tons (75 t; 83 short tons); Class 33/1 – 77.6 long tons (79 t; 87 short tons); Class 33/2 – 74.4 long tons (76 t; 83 short tons)
- Fuel capacity: 800 imp gal (3,600 L; 960 US gal)
- Prime mover: Sulzer 8LDA28
- Generator: DC generator
- Traction motors: DC traction motors
- Transmission: Diesel electric
- MU working: ★ Blue Star, 33/1 SR MU System
- Train heating: Electric Train Heat
- Train brakes: Dual (Air & Vacuum)
Performance figures
- Maximum speed: 85 mph (140 km/h)
- Power output: Engine: 1,550 bhp (1,156 kW); At rail: 1,215 hp (906 kW)
- Tractive effort: Maximum: 45,000 lbf (200 kN); Continuous: 26,000 lbf (116 kN)
- Brakeforce: 35 long tons-force (349 kN)
Career
- Operators: Former; British Rail (Southern and Eastern Regions); Direct Rail Services; English, Welsh & Scottish; Fragonset Railways; Current; West Coast Railways; Various British heritage railways
- Class: D15/1, D15/2; 15/6, 15/6A; Class 33, Class 34 (reserved, not used), Class 83/3
- Numbers: D6500–D6597; later 33001–33065, 33101–33 119, 33201–33212
- Nicknames: Cromptons (All locomotives); Bagpipes (33/1s only); Slim Jims (33/2s only)
- Axle load class: Route availability 6
- Disposition: 3 still in service, 24 preserved, 2 stored, remainder scrapped

The British Rail Class 33, also known as the BRCW Type 3 or Crompton, is a class of Bo-Bo diesel-electric locomotives, ordered in 1957 and built for the Southern Region of British Railways between 1960 and 1962.

They were produced as a more powerful Type 3 (1,550 bhp) development of the 1,160 bhp Type 2 Class 26. This was achieved, quite simply, by removing the steam heating boiler and fitting a larger 8 cylinder version of the previous 6 cylinder engine. This was possible because of the traffic requirements of the Southern Region: locomotive-hauled passenger traffic depended on seasonal tourist traffic and was heavier in the summer, when carriage heating was not needed. In the winter, their expected use was to be for freight. Thus, they became the most powerful BR Bo-Bo diesel locomotive. The perennially unreliable steam heating boiler could also be avoided.

A total of 98 were built by the Birmingham Railway Carriage and Wagon Company (BRCW) and they were known as "Cromptons" after the Crompton Parkinson electrical equipment installed in them. Like their lower-powered BRCW sisters, the Class 26 and Class 27 locomotives, their bodywork and cab ends were of all steel construction. They were very similar in appearance to Class 26 locos, but carried Southern Region two-digit headcode blinds between the cab windows.

The original (1957) number sequence was D6500–D6597.

== Background ==
The locomotives were initially needed, unusually, because of an electrification scheme. The 'Kent Coast scheme' was one of five major electrification schemes put forward by the 1955 Modernisation Plan. Under Stage 1 of the scheme, the majority of railway lines east of a line drawn between Reading and Portsmouth would be electrified. On secondary and branch lines not electrified, such as Tonbridge – West St. Leonards, diesel electric multiple units would work passenger services. The scheme involved the electrification of 250 route miles (400 km) of track at a cost of approximately £25m. The British Transport Commission (BTC) approved the scheme in February 1956.

The Southern Region established an Electrification Committee, which met monthly from August 1955. On the South Eastern section, electrification was to be carried out in two phases. Phase 1 would cover the north Kent routes via Chatham and Margate, including the Sheerness line, which had not featured in any previous electrification proposals. Phase 2 would cover the remainder of the South Eastern section routes that were to be electrified. The initial assessment was that eighty-eight 1,000 horsepower (750 kW) and twenty 2,000 horsepower (1,500 kW) Bo-Bo diesel locomotives would be needed, plus twenty electric locomotives. By November, it was thought that 98 locomotives of 1,000 to 1,250 horsepower (750 to 930 kW) would be needed. That figure was based on the locomotives collectively achieving 2,375,624 miles (3,823,196 km) annually. The locomotives would be used on passenger, van and freight trains, as well as working inter-regional services. The British Transport Commission approved the electrification scheme in February 1956.

By April 1956, it was apparent that the new locomotives would not be powerful enough, as the Southern Region was intent on eliminating the steam heating of its trains in favour of electric train heating (ETH). As an interim, it was intended that fifteen 1,160 horsepower (870 kW) Sulzer Type 2 locomotives would be allocated to the Southern Region. The Electrification Committee informed the BTC of their requirements in October, advising them that they had been in contact with Sulzer Brothers Ltd. to determine whether or not a locomotive in the 1,500 to 1,750 horsepower (1,120 to 1,300 kW) range could be built. On 4 December, a meeting between the General and Assistant General Managers of the Southern Region and the BTCs Secretary-General, Chief Mechanical Engineer and a Technical member, it was agreed to approach English Electric to build the locomotives. This was against the competitive tendering policy in force at the time, but was done as it was thought that this would be the quickest way to acquire the locomotives. A few days later, BTC Chairman Sir Brian Robertson told a director of Vickers-Armstrong Ltd. of the plan at a social event. Vickers-Armstrong was the builder of Sulzer engines in the United Kingdom. The company was not happy with the situation and a protest was made. In February 1957, the BTC decided to put the process for the procurement of the new locomotives out to tender.

To enable Phase 1 of the electrification to be implemented in June 1959, forty-five diesel locomotives would be needed. In addition, fifteen Type 2 locomotives (later class 24) would be loaned by the London Midland Region. Tenders were returned to the Electrification Committee in July 1957. The committee made its recommendations to the BTC, which met on 8 August. The BTC discussed an order for forty-five locomotives at a cost of £76,970 each. They were to be built by the Birmingham Railway Carriage and Wagon Company (BRCW), with Crompton Parkinson electrical equipment and Sulzer engines. Deliveries were to start in April 1959, with thirty locomotives in service by June. Despite offering a cheaper locomotive and better delivery times, English Electric did not gain the order. The BTC approved the order on 26 September. The order was not placed until 5 December. Under the terms of the tender, deliveries were to start 21 months from the placing of the order, and continue at three per month thereafter. This meant that the first locomotives would be delivered in November 1959 and completed by February 1961. None of the locomotives would be in service for the planned start date of Phase 1 of the electrification plan. At their January 1958 meeting, the Electrification Committee heard that delivery of the locomotives would be calculated once all technical details had been agreed. One locomotive would be delivered 21 months thereafter, two the following month and three per month after that. This pushed back final delivery until March 1961.

In February 1958, the BTC approved the purchase of thirty-four Type 2 locomotives, but deferred a decision on 51 others due to be built in 1959, including twenty needed for Phase 2 of the electrification programme. In November, the Electrification Committee was informed that due to the delays in delivery, the phasing out of steam locomotives would be delayed. It was agreed to push for the purchase of the second batch of 20 locomotives. (Note: For the purpose of this article, the four batches are listed in the order that they were approved by the BTC. Batch 1 comprises D6500–44, batch 2 comprises D6545–64, batch 3 comprises D6586–97 and batch 4 comprises D6565–85.) The BTC discussed the purchase later that month, and agreed to accept BRCWs tender of £78,940 per locomotive. Eleven locomotives were to be delivered by December 1960 and the rest by February 1961.

In February 1959, the Electrification Committee discussed a third batch of 33 locomotives, including 12 suitable to work the Hastings line. The BTC approved the locomotives for the Hastings line in May, but deferred a decision on the other 21. These locomotives would cost £78,858 each. In July, the Electrification Committee expressed the view that the remaining locomotives should be ordered without delay. In August, there was concern that late deliveries would impact on driver training. The BTC approved the order of the final 21 locomotives in September at a cost of £78,380 each. In December, BRCW reported to the Electrification Committee that the first locomotive would not be delivered until 8 January 1960. The Electrification Committee met again on 14 January, and were told that the first locomotive would not be delivered until 22 January, with another in February and a total of 9 by 16 April. It was hoped that all forty-five locomotives of the first batch will have been delivered by October. The committee met again on 19 January. It was stated that the intention was that the second batch of locomotives would have been delivered by 11 September 1961. The third batch (for the Hastings line) were needed in service by June 1962. It was hoped that deliveries would begin in July 1961 and be completed in September. The first locomotive, numbered D6500, was delivered on 30 January.

The Electrification Committee met again on 10 March, when they were told that only thirteen of the twenty locomotives of the first batch would be in service by June, although it was hoped that all forty-five would be in service by October. Concerns were expressed that Ramsgate Motive Power Depot (MPD) would not be able to close by 14 November as planned. Its site was needed for the construction of a new maintenance facility for electric multiple units. The committee met again in May. As delivery of all forty-five locomotives of the first batch was projected not to be completed until 31 January 1961, the closure of Ramsgate MPD was postponed. The committee was told that delays in the delivery of the third batch would mean that the replacement of steam on the Hastings line would have to be postponed. The committee met in June. It was agreed that Ramsgate MPD could close once thirty-five locomotives had been delivered. It was anticipated that this would be achieved by 30 November allowing the shed to close on 1 December. By the time the Electrification Committee met on 10 November, thirty locomotives had been delivered. Consequently, Ramsgate MPD would not be able to be closed until at least 19 December. Delivery of the locomotives for the Hastings line was also likely to be delayed. When the committee met in December, the thirty-five locomotives had been delivered and permission was given for the closure of Ramsgate MPD. The BTC wanted to arrange a test of the ETH system fitted to the locomotives. It was agreed that a locomotive would be released at the end of January 1961 for three weeks.

The Electrification Committee met in February 1961. Delivery of the first of the second batch of locomotives was due to start on 24 February and be complete by 7 July. The third batch was due to be delivered between 8 December and 23 February 1962 and the fourth batch by the end of June 1962. The final locomotive of the first batch, D6544, was delivered fourteen months later than the original delivery date. Delivery of the first of the second batch of locomotives was on 7 March. The committee met again in April. Although delivery of the second batch of locomotives was still on schedule for 7 July, by the time at Phase 2 of the electrification scheme was put into operation in June, there would be a shortfall of fifteen locomotives against the number required. When the committee met in May, delivery of the last of the second batch of locomotives had been put back to 15 July. The third batch would not start to be delivered until 23 February 1962, with completion by 31 March. The fourth batch was scheduled to be delivered between 23 January and 31 March 1962. The committee met again in July. Completion of the second batch of locomotives had been pushed back to 29 July. Start of deliveries of the third and fourth batches had been delayed, but final deliver dates remained the same. The Electrification Committee met for the final time on 14 September. Delivery of the fourth batch had started; 69 locomotives had been delivered up to that date. As Phase 2 of the electrification scheme had been implemented, the Southern Region set up the Traction Committee, which met for the first time on 15 December. Eighty-one of the 85 Restriction 4 locomotives had been delivered, but the final locomotive was not now due for delivery until 12 January 1962. Delivery of the locomotives for the Hastings line was due to start a week later, and be complete by 6 April 1962. At that meeting discussion took place in respect of the annual mileage the fleet would accrue. The original estimate of 2,375,624 miles (3,823,196 km) had been revised upwards to 3,943,414 miles (6,346,310 km) but had then been revised down to 2,465,000 miles (3,967,000 km) due to the introduction of electric multiple units for most passenger trains and changes in freight requirements. This meant that only 70 locomotives would be needed, leaving 28 surplus to requirements. Reallocation of the surplus locomotives was discussed. BTC approval was needed for reallocation, although the BTC had the power to order the locomotives to be reallocated. They could have challenged the Southern Region as to why the order had not been amended. By this time, two locomotives had been transferred to the Eastern Region to work cement trains between Cliffe, Kent and Uddingston, Lanarkshire.

The Traction Committee met again in January 1962. With seven locomotives allocated to the cement trains, work had to be found for the remaining 21. If these locomotives were allocated to the South Western Division to work tank trains from Fawley Refinery to various destinations in the London Midland and Western Regions, 36 steam locomotives could be withdrawn from service. The oil traffic was a new introduction, for which no provision had been made in the locomotive building programme. By the time then next meeting of the committee in March, some of the locomotives had been temporarily transferred to the South Western Division. The BTC were apprised of the situation in respect of the spare locomotives. It was stated that the new timetable due for introduction in June had a substantial reduction in freight, which had only been recently decided upon and could not have been foreseen when the locomotives were ordered. The BTC replied that they were concerned at the drastic cut in numbers required. They felt that the locomotives could be used following Stages 2 and 3 of the electrification programme. Another possibility was using the locomotives in the Sheffield area, where the order of a number of Type 3 locomotives had already been authorised. The locomotives lack of steam heating was a factor against their use however. The committee responded that the use following the implementation of Stages 2 and 3 held good. They appreciated the BTCs position over the Sheffield scheme, but would put forward proposals that kept the locomotives on the Southern Region. In March, the General Manager's department held a meeting to discuss the use of the locomotives on the Fawley oil trains. The Traction Committee met in April. They were told that the South Western Division had identified that the twenty-one locomotives could be used on the Fawley oil trains. A formal justification would be made to the BTC for the use of locomotives on the cement trains. This traffic was profitable and the contract had been negotiated on the basis that diesel locomotives would be used.

A meeting between the Southern and Eastern Regions on 31 May resulted in a decision that only four locomotives would be needed to work the cement trains. The Central Division had identified that the three spare locomotives could be used on freight trains between Tonbridge and Reading. The BTC met on 29 June to consider the reallocation of the spare locomotives. Fifteen were to be allocated to the Fawley oil traffic, nine to cross-London freight traffic from Feltham and four to the Cliffe cement traffic. The use of the locomotives on the South Western Division would allow the withdrawal of forty-nine steam locomotives and a loss of thirty-five jobs. A meeting of Southern Region officials on 16 July discussed the exact information that the BTC required for the permanent reallocation of the spare locomotives. The issue would be discussed at a Board meeting of the Southern Region to be held on 6 September. The Western Region had reservations about the locomotives working the Fawley oil trains single-headed. A test with a 1,000-ton train between Winchester and Didcot on 31 July had been successful. The Western Region had agreed that these trains could be worked single-handed by 12 September, when the Traction Committee met.

== Design ==
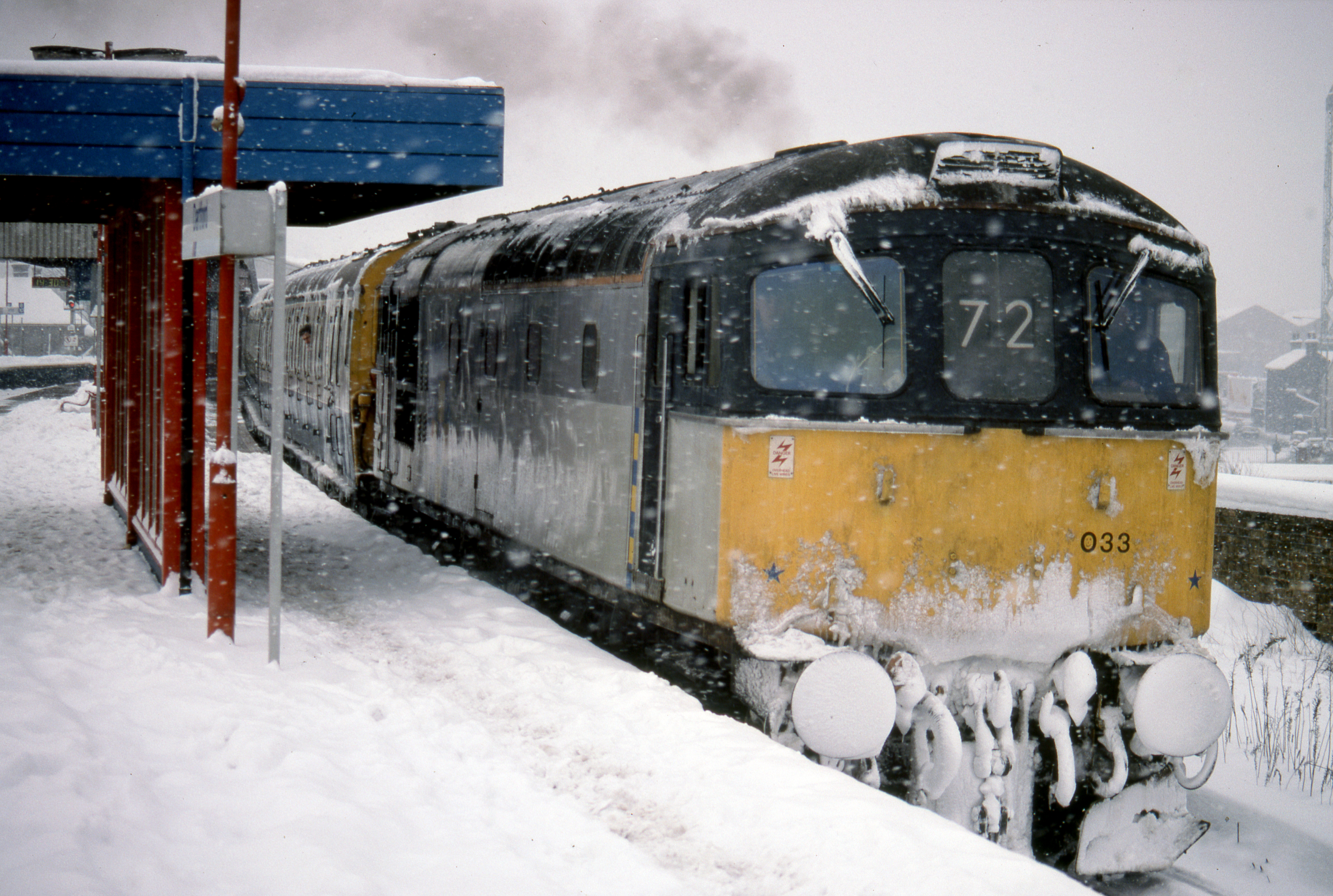
Class 33 'Crompton' 33033 at Dartford Station in wintery conditions in February 1991. It is seen here coupled up to a pair of 4-EPBs, ready to haul the units to Charing Cross.

The locomotives were based on the Sulzer Type 2 locomotives that BRCW had built for the Scottish Region of British Railways. The cabs were altered slightly, with the centre section housing a two figure route indicator. They were built at BRCWs Smethwick works. The underframe and bodysides form an integral superstructure. The cabs are double skinned, with driving controls both sides to make shunting easier. The roof is of glass reinforced plastic. Bogies are identical to those used on the Sulzer Type 2, with SKF roller bearings and brakes on all wheels. The handbrake works on the inner set of wheels of each bogie. The engine is a Sulzer 8LDA28 diesel engine, built by Vickers-Armstrong at Barrow-in-Furness, Lancashire. It has eight cylinders of 280 mm bore by 360 mm stroke and develops 1,550 horsepower (1,160 kW) at 750 rpm. A Sulzer de Havilland LAG 37-17 turbocharger is fitted. The main generator is a Crompton Parkinson CG391-B1. The locomotives are fitted with dual air and vacuum brakes and can work in multiple with any other "blue star" locomotives.

=== Electric train heating (ETH) ===
The electrical heating system worked at a DC voltage of 800 V, with a generator capacity of 235 kilowatts (315 hp). As this was early days for ETH on BR, standards were not yet clear and there was a possibility in this region of a future need to heat continental stock from boat trains. Both two pole and single pole systems were supported; two pole becoming the standard on BR but some continental stock using a single pole system with return through the rails.

Electrically, the main traction generator was separate from the heating generator, although both were built mechanically as part of the same machine. A third auxiliary generator of 57 kW was arranged similarly, to provide a supply for the traction motor cooling blowers, pumps, brake exhausters etc. The electrical rating for traction power was the same whether heating was in use or not, but the excess engine power now became available for traction.

Avoiding the weight of the boiler and its water and fuel supplies allowed the diesel fuel capacity to be increased from 500 gallons to 800 gallons, compared to the Type 2s.

== New-build locomotives ==
=== Class 33/0 – standard locomotives ===
All 86 of the first delivery were built as standard locomotives, numbered D6500 to D6585. Under TOPS they became class 33/0 and the surviving locomotives, excluding the 19 that were converted for push-pull operation, were renumbered 33 001–33 065. The locomotives were built to Restriction 4, which was the normal standard and equivalent to British Railways standard C1 restriction. All 86 locomotives were route availability 6. Two accident-damaged locomotives were withdrawn before TOPS took effect.

=== Class 33/2 – narrow-bodied locomotives ===
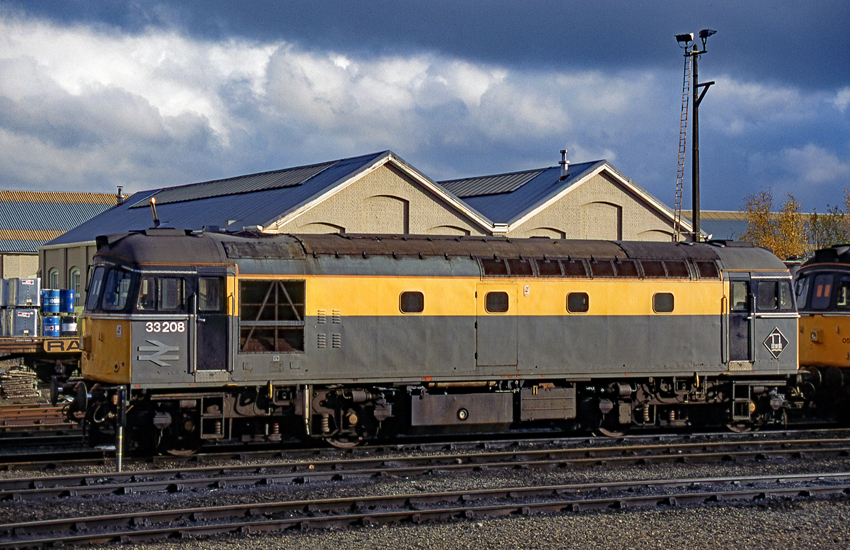
33208 in BR civil engineers livery at Eastleigh, 1995

A batch of twelve locomotives was built with narrow bodies, to allow them to work through the narrow tunnels between Tunbridge Wells, Kent, and Hastings, Sussex. The Hastings Line was designated Restriction 0. This required the bodies to be reduced in width to avoid clipping tunnel linings on that line, leading to their nickname of 'Slim Jims'. These locomotives were 8 feet 8 inches (2.64 m) wide over the steps and 8 ft 1 1/2 in (2.48 m) over the body. Originally numbered D6586 to D6597, they were later renumbered 33201 to 33212. These locomotives were fitted with slow-speed control to enable them to work merry-go-round trains. All 12 locomotives were route availability 6.

== Early years ==
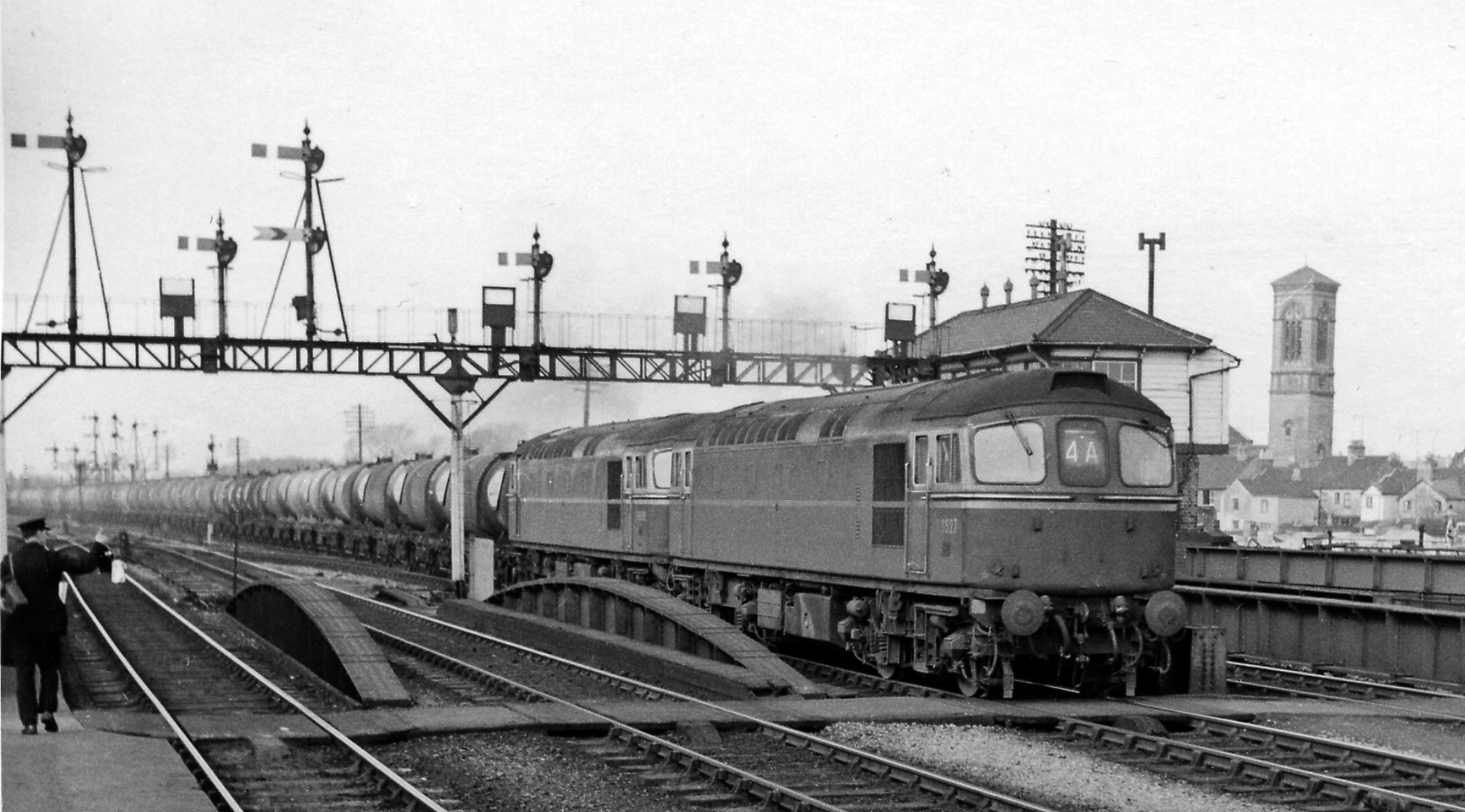
A pair of 33s - D6527 and D6505 at Oxford with a Bromford Bridge to Fawley oil train in 1964

Distribution of locomotives, March 1974
British Rail Class 33 is located in Southern England
Code	Name	Quantity
EH	Eastleigh	49
HG	Hither Green	47
Withdrawn (1964–68)		2
Total built:		98

D6500 entered service on 30 January 1960. D6501 on 28 February and D6502/3/4 in March. On 2 April, D6502 and D5012 worked a boat train from London Victoria to Dover Western Docks via Chatham. A new timetable was introduced on 13 June. There were twelve locomotives available, enough to enable the class to be introduced to passenger trains, including the Man of Kent and Night Ferry. The class was also introduced to service of freight trains between Hither Green and Dover. They were allowed to haul 500-ton trains via Tonbridge, dropping to 460 tons via Chislehurst and Faversham and 450 tons via Maidstone East. On 17 July, locomotives D6506, E5004 and 20002 were used on the Brighton Main Line for rail joint tests between Three Bridges and Haywards Heath.

With the introduction of the winter timetable in September, the class were largely withdrawn from passenger service due to carriages still being heated by steam. Some trains were worked by steam locomotives and others by the Type 2 locomotives. Occasionally the class worked unheated passenger trains. D6504 was used for ETH tests on the Eastern Region of British Railways. It was exhibited at Stratford, London on 17 and 18 February in connection with a committee meeting of the UIC. The locomotive hauled trains between London King's Cross and Edinburgh Waverley between 13 and 17 February. Phase 2 of the electrification scheme came into service on 12 June 1961. The last of the second batch of locomotives, D6564, was delivered on 28 July. Delivery of the fourth batch of locomotives took place between 18 August and 12 January 1962.

In November 1961, D6569 and D6559 were transferred to the Eastern Region to work Cliffe–Uddingston cement trains. These trains comprised 30 wagons, with a train weight of 1,050 tons. A pair of locomotives hauled the trains from Cliffe to Ferme Park, just north of King's Cross. Haulage of the train was then taken over by Eastern or North Eastern Region locomotives. It was soon found that these locomotives were unable to keep to the schedule demanded. The Southern Region agreed that their locomotives could work the train as far as York, operated by Eastern Region crews north of Ferme Park. This enabled an earlier arrival at York and the overall scheduled timing to Uddingston to be met. Seven locomotives were allocated to this traffic, allowing one to be spare. Operating costs were £104 per train, (Note: Not including the traincrew's wages.) about half that of using steam locomotives. The round trip took 44 hours. One of these trains, hauled by D6558, appeared in The Rank Organisation's 1963 film High, Wide and Faster, part of its documentary series Look at Life.

The third batch of locomotives was delivered between 2 February and 12 May 1962. In April, three locomotives were transferred to the South Western Division to work oil trains from Fawley Refinery, Hampshire. Initially, they were used on trains between Fawley and Eastleigh. In late April, a locomotive worked a Fawley–Spondon oil train as far as Didcot. It worked a freight train back to Eastleigh that day.

Only the then new electric train heating was fitted, rather than the ubiquitous steam heating which passenger carriages largely used. Early delivery problems and a shortage of steam locomotives resulted in many Class 24 locomotives being borrowed from the Midland Region and pairs, of 33 + 24, became common on winter passenger services. This resulted in unpopular, complex run-round manoeuvres at termini as the Class 24 needed to be coupled inside to provide steam heat. Emergency provisioning of through-piping for steam heat on some examples of class 33 alleviated this somewhat. The Southern Region was unaccustomed to the operational overhead and maintenance associated with the use of Class 24s and they rapidly became unpopular. With the advent of modern stock and warmer seasons, they were returned to the Midland Region.

== Push-pull operations ==
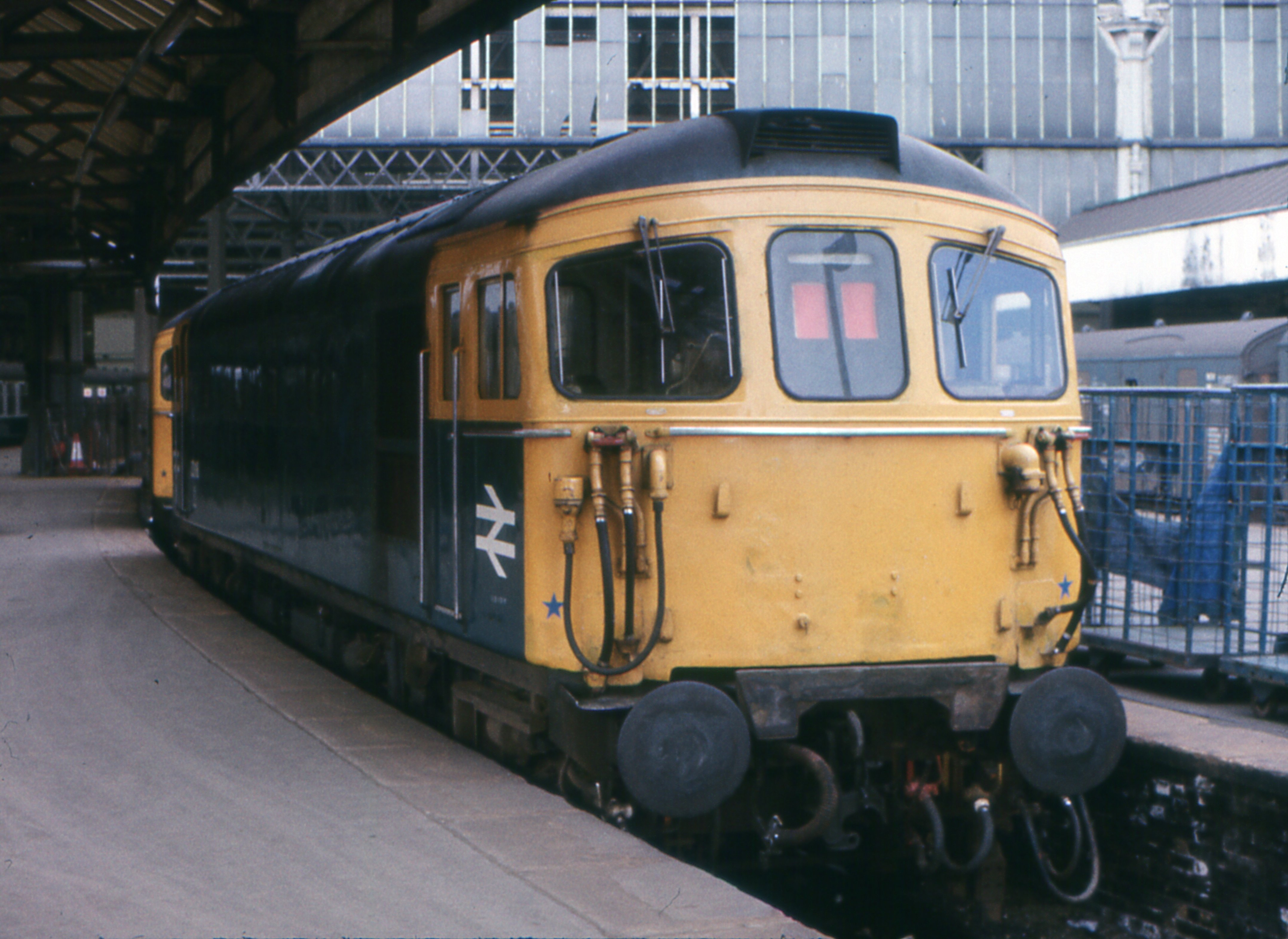
33118 at London Waterloo

The mainstay of push-pull operations was the operation over the then un-electrified track from Bournemouth to Weymouth and the service continued like this across three decades. Weymouth trains started at London Waterloo powered by third-rail electric traction via Winchester and Southampton to Bournemouth. The consist was normally twelve cars made up of a powerful 3,200 hp (2,400 kW) 4REP electric multiple unit on the rear with two leading units of un-powered 4TCs. At Bournemouth the train would be divided with the 4REP remaining at the London end of Bournemouth station and the 4TCs hauled onward to Poole and Weymouth by Class 33/1. On the return leg, the locomotive propelled the train back to Bournemouth where it would be attached to a waiting London-bound 4REP and the locomotive detached to await the next Weymouth-bound portion.

The usual configuration was 4TC+4TC+Loco with the locomotive at the country end. Light traffic would result in 4TC+Loco, and in rare operational circumstances 4TC+Loco+4TC was noted. This combination was not preferred, as it led to operational difficulties and inconvenience to waiting passengers who found themselves confronted with the side of the locomotive when their train drew to a halt.

The Class 33/1 with one or two 4TC sets (normally with the Class 33/1 at the country end of the train) were also the mainstay of the Waterloo – Salisbury service from their introduction. Platform congestion and the lack of facilities at the very busy Basingstoke station were two of the reasons for class 33/1 operation throughout the route rather than just over the non-electrified section west of Basingstoke.

In later years Weymouth boat trains, conveying passengers between London and the Channel Islands ferry service out of Weymouth, were handed over to push-pull operation. The section of route from Weymouth to the ship terminal at the quay was actually tramway, following (and largely in the middle of) the harbour road. The quay spur did not pass through the station, but diverged westwards at the throat thus it was not possible for boat trains to call at Weymouth station. Boat trains had been made up of conventional coaching stock and the locomotive would run-round its train on arrival at the sea-terminal. The move to push-pull sets on boat trains removed two headaches for the SR:

- The necessity for the run-round at the quay was removed.
- The locomotive swap at Bournemouth (for both up and down trains) was eliminated and services were greatly improved with the removal of the troublesome Class 74 locomotive from the equation.

Although class 73 and 74 electro-diesel locomotives had push-pull capability, they did not have the endurance for longer runs on diesel power – their 600/650HP was not even Type 1, little more than a high-powered shunter equivalent. The Type 3 power of Class 33/1 with only a 4 or 8 car train was rarely into the recovery margin of a schedule due to load.

Class 33/1 and 4TC combinations were often used to supplement other services and were not just the purview of Bournemouth-Weymouth trains. Services could be rostered for a push-pull set due to stock shortages – the Reading to Basingstoke service (normally a stronghold of DEMU sets) could be relied upon to produce a push-pull set on Sundays. Often, electric rosters would be substituted by class 33/1 + 4TC if the line was de-energised during engineering work. Indeed, push-pull sets were a possibility over the entire range of Southern Region services including inter-regional trains; they were not infrequent visitors to Bristol Temple Meads and have been noted at Cardiff.

Although in private ownership at the time, 33103 and 4TC 417 were spot-hired for use on Barking-Gospel Oak services during a stock shortage in 1999 and worked the service for some weeks without issue.

=== Conversions – Class 33/1 – push-pull fitted locomotives ===
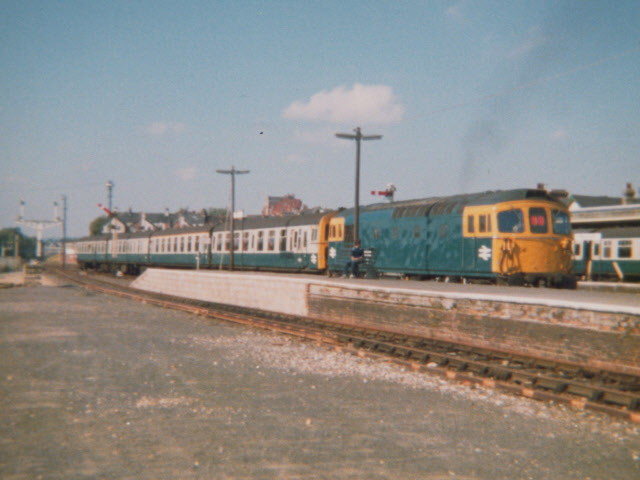
33102 propelling a 4TC unit from Weymouth, 1987.

While third rail electrification was expanding on the Southern region, it was not then considered to be justified to extend beyond Bournemouth and so, in 1965, D6580 was fitted with experimental push-pull apparatus, high-level brake pipes and jumper cables to make it compatible with Multiple Unit stock. Commencing 21 July 1965 tests were carried out between Wimbledon Park and Basingstoke and then, from 17 January 1966, on the Oxted Line, using a 6-coach rake of unpowered multiple unit coaches (designated TC, standing for Trailer Control). The use of this equipment removed the necessity for the locomotive to run around to the front of its train at each terminus, as it could be controlled from the driving position of a TC unit and hence could propel its train from the rear.

Following successful completion of trials, D6580 and a further eighteen other members of the class (D6511, D6513, D6514, D6516, D6517, D6519, D6520, D6521, D6525, D6527, D6528, D6529, D6531, D6532, D6533, D6535, D6536 and D6538) entered Eastleigh Works, to be fitted with a modified version of the push-pull apparatus – fully compatible with Class 73 and Class 74 electro-diesels and indeed any electro-pneumatically controlled (EP) multiple unit stock. They emerged, painted in the new BR corporate blue with full yellow ends. D6521 had re-entered service by November 1966, so equipped, and by November 1967 the remainder had returned to traffic fitted for push-pull working.

With the advent of TOPS, Class 34 was originally reserved for these modified locomotives - but it was not used and they were grouped, instead, into class 33/1 and the nineteen locomotives were renumbered, sequentially, in the range 33101–33119.

They settled into sterling service, proving themselves highly useful and reliable. The prototype locomotive (D6580, later 33119) was the only member of Class 33 to run in green livery with the multiple unit control equipment – not to be confused with preserved members of Class 33/1 that have been repainted green.

=== Tramway safety ===
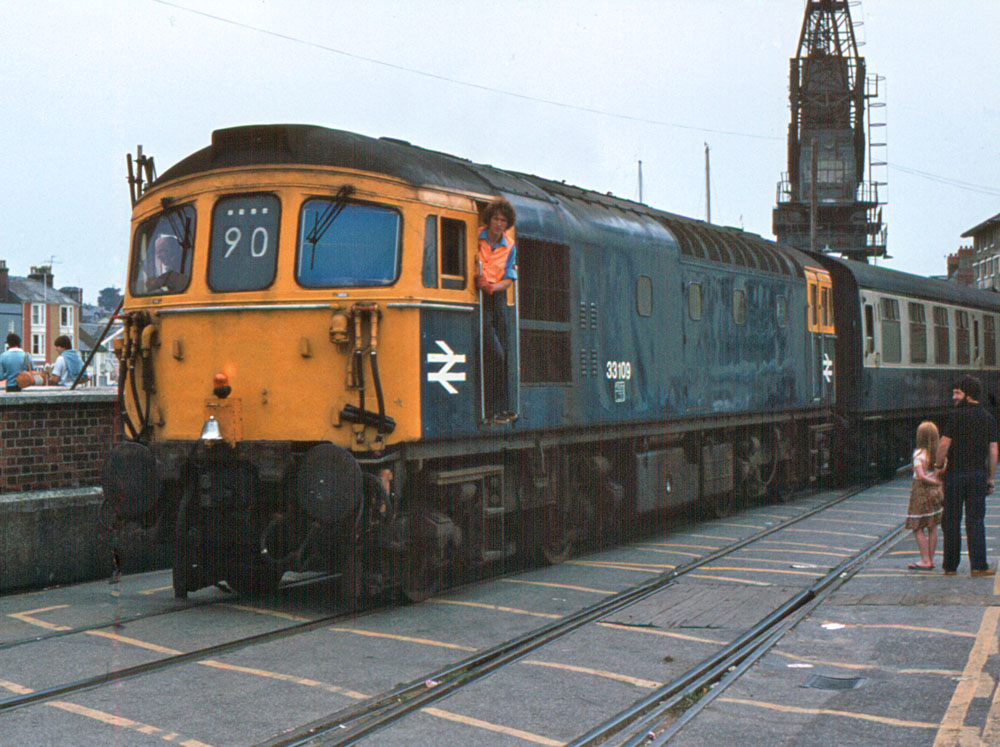
33109 arrives at the ferry terminal having negotiated the Weymouth Harbour Tramway on its way to quay in 1981. Note the bell and beacon warning unit on the cab front and the platform height air brake pipes with two rolled flags wedged behind.

Allocated to work the Weymouth Harbour Tramway, trains operating over public thoroughfare tramway without escort are required to be fitted with warning equipment for the general public. Before its withdrawal, the Class 33 Weymouth pilot would regularly take fuel-oil tank wagons (for the ferries) and occasionally boat-train stock between Weymouth yard and ferry terminal. It had a bell and beacon fitted at both ends above the lower-centre headcode lamp (along with SR style high-level brake pipes) which served to warn thoroughfare users and was controlled from the cab. For main-line stock, two warning units were built and housed in a cabinet at the track side of the quay spur at the throat of the yard. This equipment comprised a yellow control box with amber rotating beacon and bell which fitted on a bracket just above the rubbing plate on the cab front. Class 33/1 and all TC stock were equipped with this bracket and had a socket where units plugged-in to draw power from the train systems, similar to the RCH socket on coaching stock. This was a specific complexity with the two types and in order to standardize and remove a maintenance risk, in the early 1980s, three battery-powered units were constructed which mounted on a standard lamp bracket with no need to draw power from the train. This allowed the power and control circuitry for warning units to be removed during (and thus simplifying) overhaul. The old power sockets were gradually removed and plated-over but some remained until withdrawal of the stock. These new warning units enabled other types of stock to use the tramway including Class 73 and Class 37 (on a railtour - which struggled with the tight curves of the tramway due to its three-axle bogies). These later warning units were smaller with an on/off switch on the rear of the unit and no bell – warnings being given using the train horn.

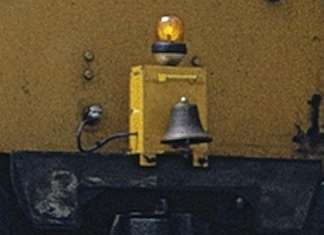
The bell and beacon unit for tramway operation, fitted to the rubbing plate and plugged into the train systems via a small connector on the front of all class 33/1 and TC multiple units

Trains for the quay would halt at the station throat, and the warning equipment was attached and tested by the train guard. In addition, trains on the tramway were "walked" by railway staff with flags, clearing the route of people and badly parked cars all the way between the points at which the tramway reverted to conventional track at the quay station and road crossing into Weymouth yard. On arrival at the quay terminus the guard would move the warning equipment to the other end of the train in readiness for the return journey. In later years, (e.g. for Railtours) the local police fulfilled the role of traffic control and the process of moving a train along the tramway became less routine.

== Accidents and incidents ==
- At 02:02 on 8 December 1961, a freight train was setting back at Paddock Wood station when the 00:20 goods from Hoo Junction to Tonbridge, hauled by D6506, overran signals and collided with it. The wreckage from the accident piled up under the bridge carrying the B2160 Maidstone Road. The line was blocked for 12 hours. D6506 was severely damaged. It arrived at Eastleigh Works for repair on 29 December.
- On 23 March 1963, locomotive D6520 was hauling a freight that was derailed between Burghclere and Highclere, Hampshire.
- On 5 March 1964, locomotive D6502 was hauling a freight train when it ran through signals at Itchingfield Junction, West Sussex and was in a rear-end collision with a freight train. Two people were killed. Damage was so extensive that the locomotive was cut up on site.
- On 30 September 1966, locomotive D6535 was hauling a freight train that overran signals and was derailed by trap points at Wallers Ash, Hampshire.
- On 16 October 1968, locomotive D6576 was involved in a collision with a Class 47 locomotive at Reading, Berkshire. Following recovery to Eastleigh Works and examination, it was considered uneconomical to repair. The locomotive was withdrawn in November 1968 and was cut up for spares in March 1969.
- On 4 January 1969, locomotive No. D6558 was hauling a parcels train that was run into by a passenger train at Marden, Kent.
- On 28 July 1971, locomotive No. 6561 was hauling a parcels train that was derailed at Guildford, Surrey.
- On 11 September 1975, locomotive No. 33041 was involved in a collision at Bricklayers Arms Junction and was consequently written off.
- On 11 October 1977, locomotives No. 33036 and 33043 were hauling a freight train that was derailed at Mottingham, London. Due to damage sustained, 33036 was withdrawn from service and scrapped.
- On 25 February 1979, locomotive No. 33115 was hauling a passenger train which was involved in a collision with an engineers' crane near Hilsea. One person was killed in the accident. 33115 was out of traffic until 1980.
- On 26 January 1985, locomotive 33104 ran into the rear of a passenger train formed of 4VEP units 7754 & 7703 and 4CIG unit 7395 which had been halted by a landslip near Popham, Hampshire. The crew of the passenger train had failed to protect the rear of their train, Twelve people were injured. The locomotive was written off.
- On 24 March 1987, a freight train overran a signal at Frome North Junction, Somerset. Locomotive No. 33032 was hauling a passenger train that was in a head-on collision with the freight train (hauled by 47202). Fifteen people were injured, but only the driver of the freight train seriously. 33032 was stored at Frome West stone terminal and on 4 June 1987 it was hauled back to Eastleigh Works, where it was later broken up.
- On 20 April 1989 locomotive number 33107 collided with the rear of a freight train at Holton Heath, between Wareham and Hamworthy Junction, according to television news the driver of 33107 was killed as he jumped from the locomotive.

== 83301 ==
In May 1991, locomotive 33115 was converted to a test locomotive in connection with the Channel Tunnel works. It was fitted with bogies that had third rail collection shoes. The locomotive was renumbered 83301. A test train formed of 83301, 73205 London Chamber of Commerce, a Class 47/9 and 4TC set 8007 was used between Waterloo and Eastleigh, and between Stewarts Lane and Dover Western Docks. Two more carriages had been added to the train by that summer. 83301 was withdrawn in November 1994. It was stripped of parts and then scrapped in the summer of 1996.

== Preservation ==
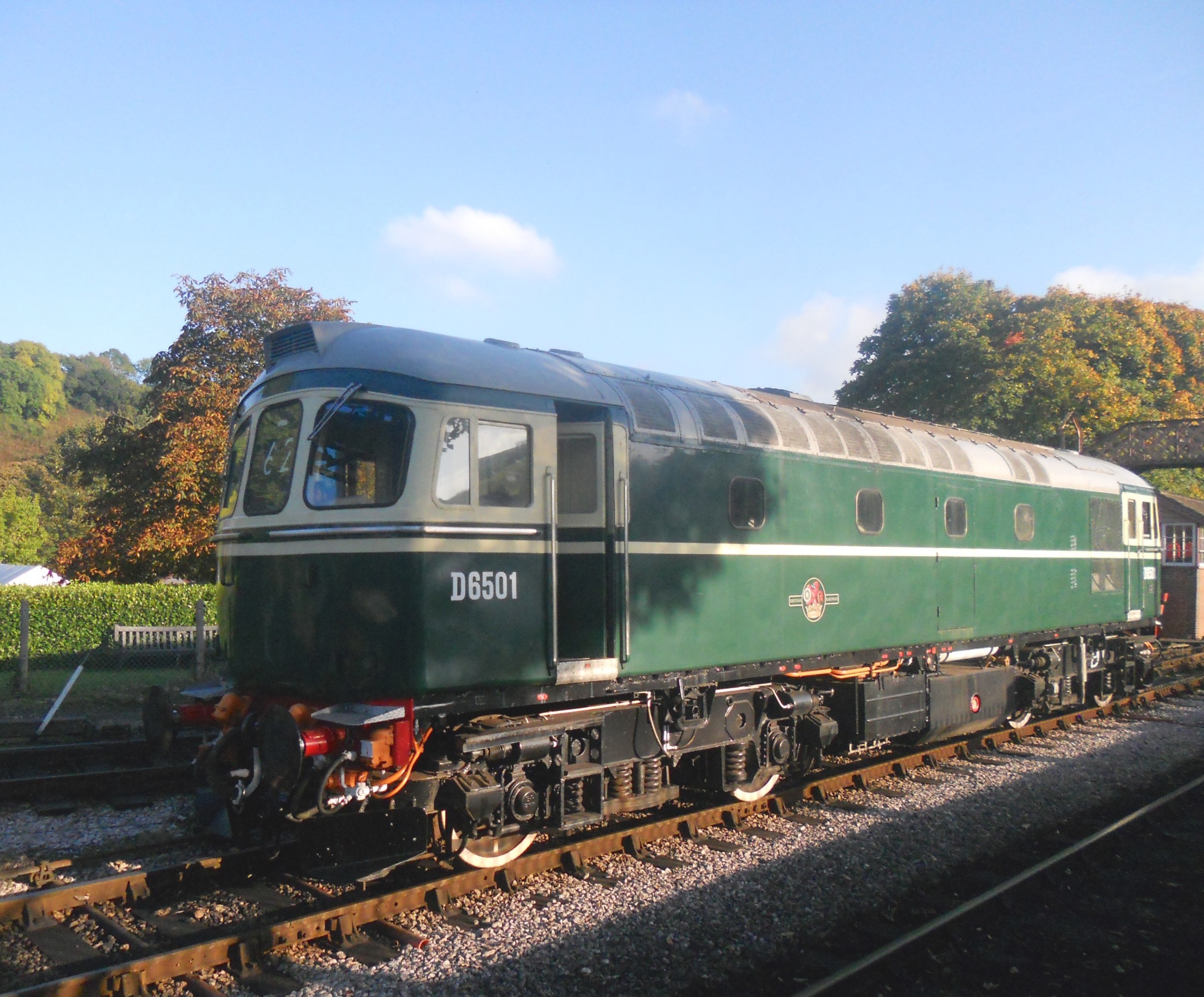
D6501 runs round the train at Buckfastleigh on the South Devon Railway.

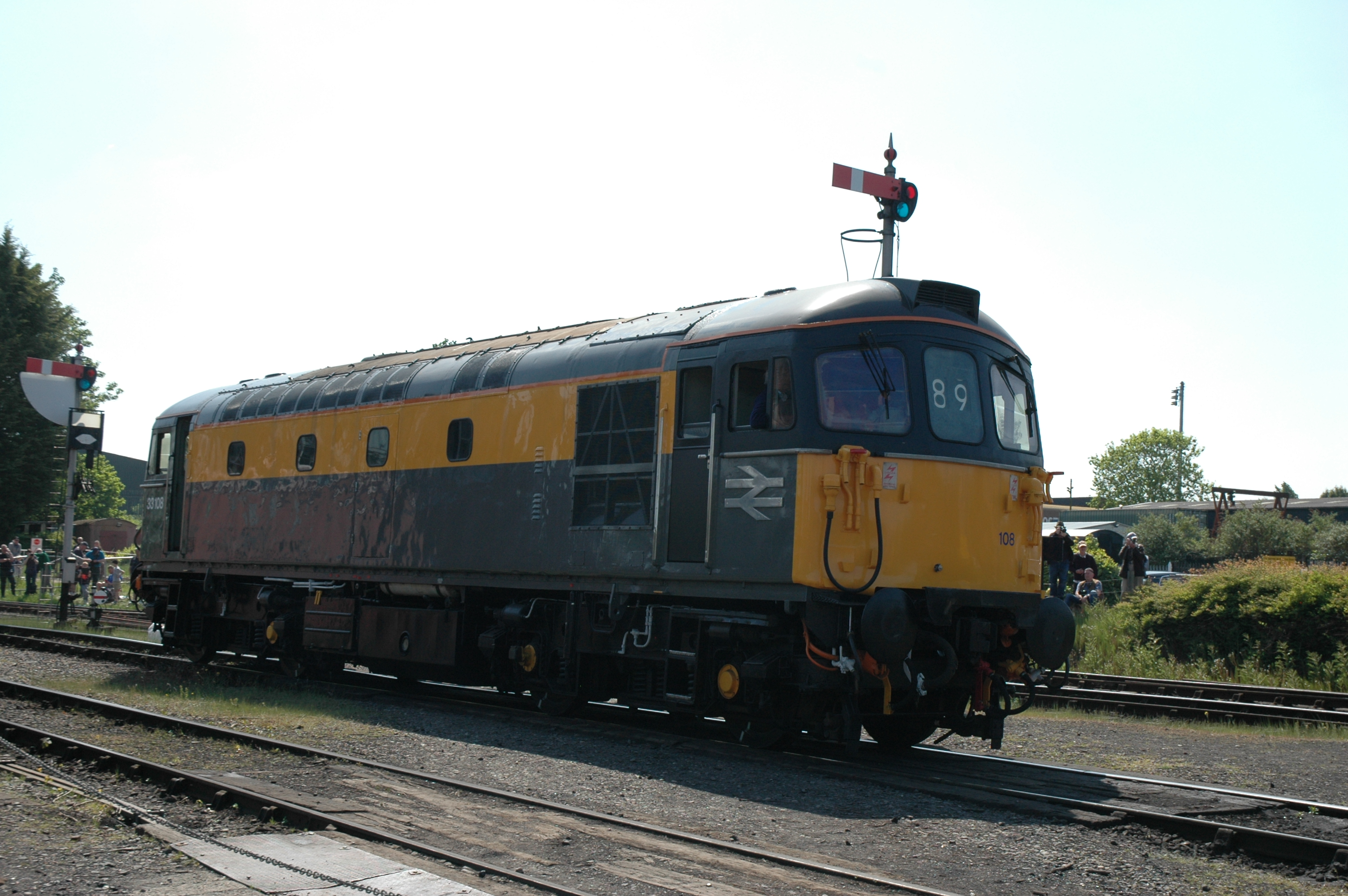
33108 pulls into Kidderminster Town station on the Severn Valley Railway in 2023

Twenty-nine locomotives have been preserved.

Table of preserved locomotives
1957 number	TOPS number	Name	Location	Status	Livery
D6501	33002	Sea King	South Devon Railway	Operational	BR Two-Tone Grey
D6508	33008	Eastleigh	Battlefield Line Railway	Undergoing Restoration	BR Green (Yellow Warning Panels)
D6515	33012	Lt Jenny Lewis RN	Swanage Railway	Operational	BR Green (Yellow Warning Panels)
D6530	33018	–	On a private site	Undergoing Restoration	BR Blue
D6534	33019	Griffon	Battlefield Line Railway	Under repair	DCE Grey and Yellow
D6539	33021	Eastleigh	Churnet Valley Railway	Operational	Post Office Red
D6543	33025	Glen Falloch / Sultan	Carnforth	Operational, Mainline Certified	West Coast Railways
D6547	33029	Glen Loy	Carnforth	Operational, Mainline Certified	West Coast Railways
D6548	33030	–	Carnforth	Stored (spares loco)	Direct Rail Services dark blue
D6553	33035	Spitfire (Name not Currently Carried)	Wensleydale Railway	Operational	Pioneer Locomotive Diesel Group, Barrow Hill BR Blue
D6564	33046	Merlin	East Lancashire Railway	Stored (spares Loco)	South West Trains blue
D6566	33048	–	West Somerset Railway	Operational	BR Green (Yellow Front)
D6570	33052	Ashford	Bluebell Railway	Under overhaul	BR Green
D6571	33053	–	Harry Needle Railroad Company	Operational	BR Blue
D6575	33057	Seagull (Name not Carried)	West Somerset Railway	Operational	BR Green (Yellow Front)
D6583	33063	R.J. Mitchell	Spa Valley Railway	Operational	Railfreight Mainline Sector
D6585	33065	Sealion	Spa Valley Railway	Undergoing heavy overhaul	BR Blue
D6513	33102	Sophie	Churnet Valley Railway	Operational	BR Blue
D6514	33103	Swordfish	Ecclesbourne Valley Railway	Operational	BR Engineers Grey
D6521	33108	Vampire	Severn Valley Railway	Operational	BR Blue
D6525	33109	Captain Bill Smith RNR	East Lancashire Railway	Operational	BR Blue
D6527	33110	–	On a private site	Undergoing Overhaul	Departmental grey
D6528	33111	–	Swanage Railway	Operational	BR Blue
D6535	33116	Hertfordshire Rail Tours	Great Central Railway	Operational	BR Blue
D6536	33117	–	East Lancashire Railway	Undergoing Repairs	BR Blue
D6586	33201	–	Battlefield Line Railway	Operational	BR Blue (Full Yellow Ends)
D6587	33202	Dennis G. Robinson	Mid Norfolk Railway	Operational	BR Blue
D6592	33207	Jim Martin	Carnforth	Operational, Mainline Certified	West Coast Railways
D6593	33208	–	Harry Needle Railroad Company	-	BR Green (Yellow Warning Panels)

== Model railways ==
Italian manufacturer Lima produced a Class 33, initially in HO gauge and O gauge and later in OO gauge. In 2010 Hornby Railways started to sell the BR Class 33 in its Railroad range in BR Green in OO gauge. This was based upon the earlier Lima model that Hornby acquired upon purchasing the liquidated assets of the Lima company in 2003. Heljan make BR Class 33s in OO gauge. Graham Farish (now part of Bachmann Industries) produce a Class 33 in British N gauge (1/148 scale).
