= Fratton Traincare Depot =

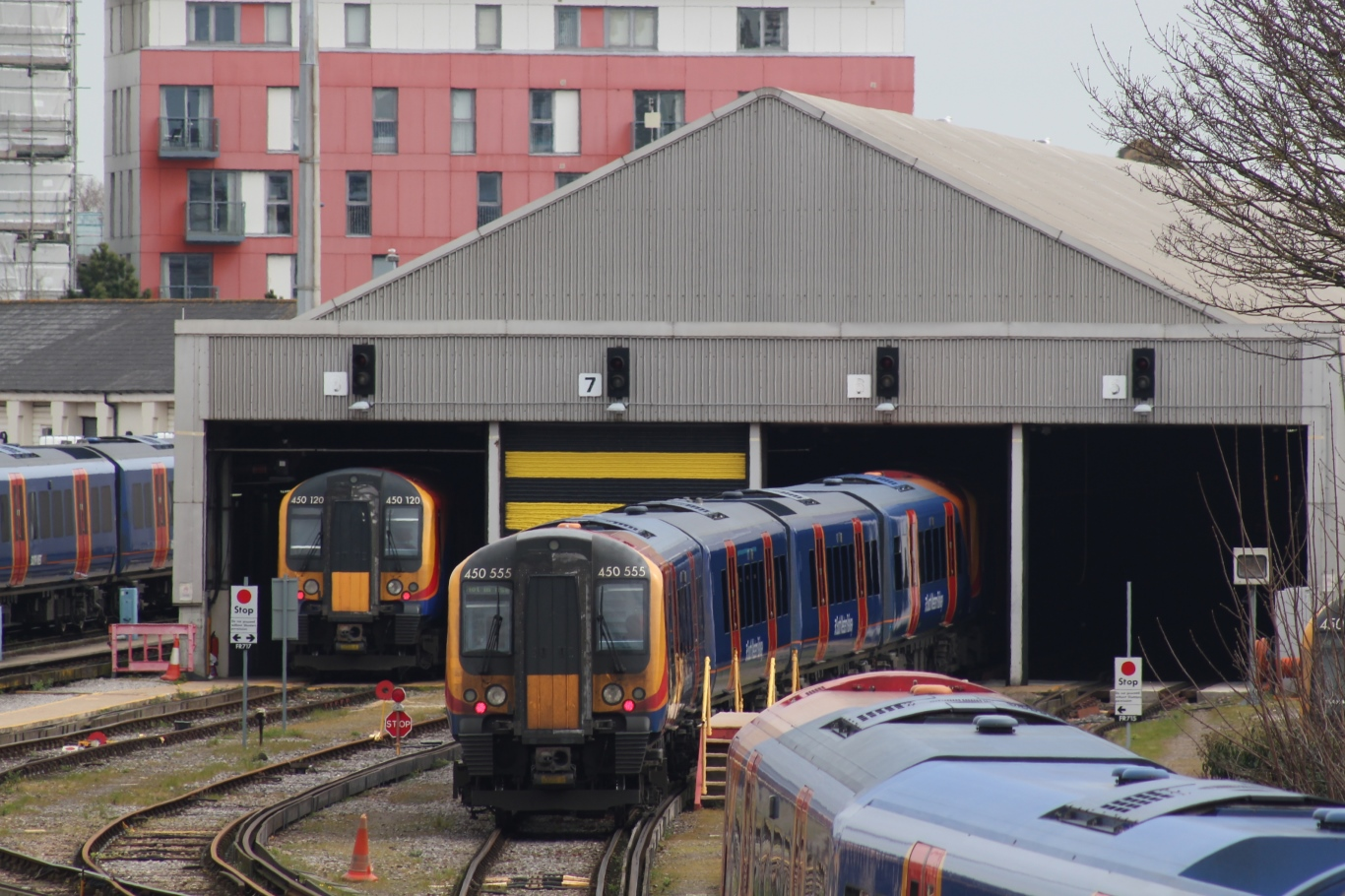
- Fratton Traincare Depot
- Interactive map of Fratton Traincare Depot

Location
- Location: Portsmouth, Hampshire, England
- Coordinates: 50.7953°N 1.0695°W
- OS grid: SU655000

Characteristics
- Depot code: FRA; FTON; 71D (1948-1954); 70F (1954-1963); Uncoded SP (1963-1973); FR (1973-)
- Type: DMU, EMU

History
- Opened: 1891

Fratton Traincare Depot is a traction maintenance depot in Portsmouth, Hampshire. The depot occupies the site alongside Fratton railway station, with two of the sidings right next to Goldsmith Avenue. It has a carriage washer and is the fuelling point for the Class 158 and Class 159 DMUs.

The depot has a train shed with two pitted roads for the maintenance of rolling stock. Class 444 and Class 450 EMUs berth overnight there, and there are stabling sidings and bay platforms at Portsmouth & Southsea station all of which come under the control of the depot at night.

Trains stabled here are generally Class 444 and Class 450 Desiro EMUs, but Class 158 and Class 159 DMUs are occasionally also stabled here. Great Western Railway and Southern stop at Fratton, and can stop their Class 158 DMUs and Class 377 EMUs in the depot if need be.

== History ==
The London Brighton and South Coast Railway and the London and South Western Railway jointly built a motive power depot at Fratton in 1891, replacing an earlier one at Portsmouth Town station. It was of the double roundhouse type. It came under the ownership of Southern Railway (Great Britain) in 1923 and British Railways in 1948. This building was badly damaged by bombs during the Second World War but repaired in 1948. It closed 2 November 1959, but the building continued to be used for stabling locomotives for several years. They were demolished in 1969.

In 1987, the depot had an allocation of Classes 412, 421 and 423 EMUs. Although, Classes 08, 09, 33 and 47 could also usually be seen stabled at the depot.

== Accidents and incidents ==
At around 01:30 on 5 August 2021 a Class 444 derailed during a shunting move, blocking access to the depot causing disruption to Great Western Railway, South Western Railway and Southern services.
