= British Rail Class 70 (electric) =

Class of three locomotives (1941–1968)

Southern Railway Class CC Electrics British Rail Class 70
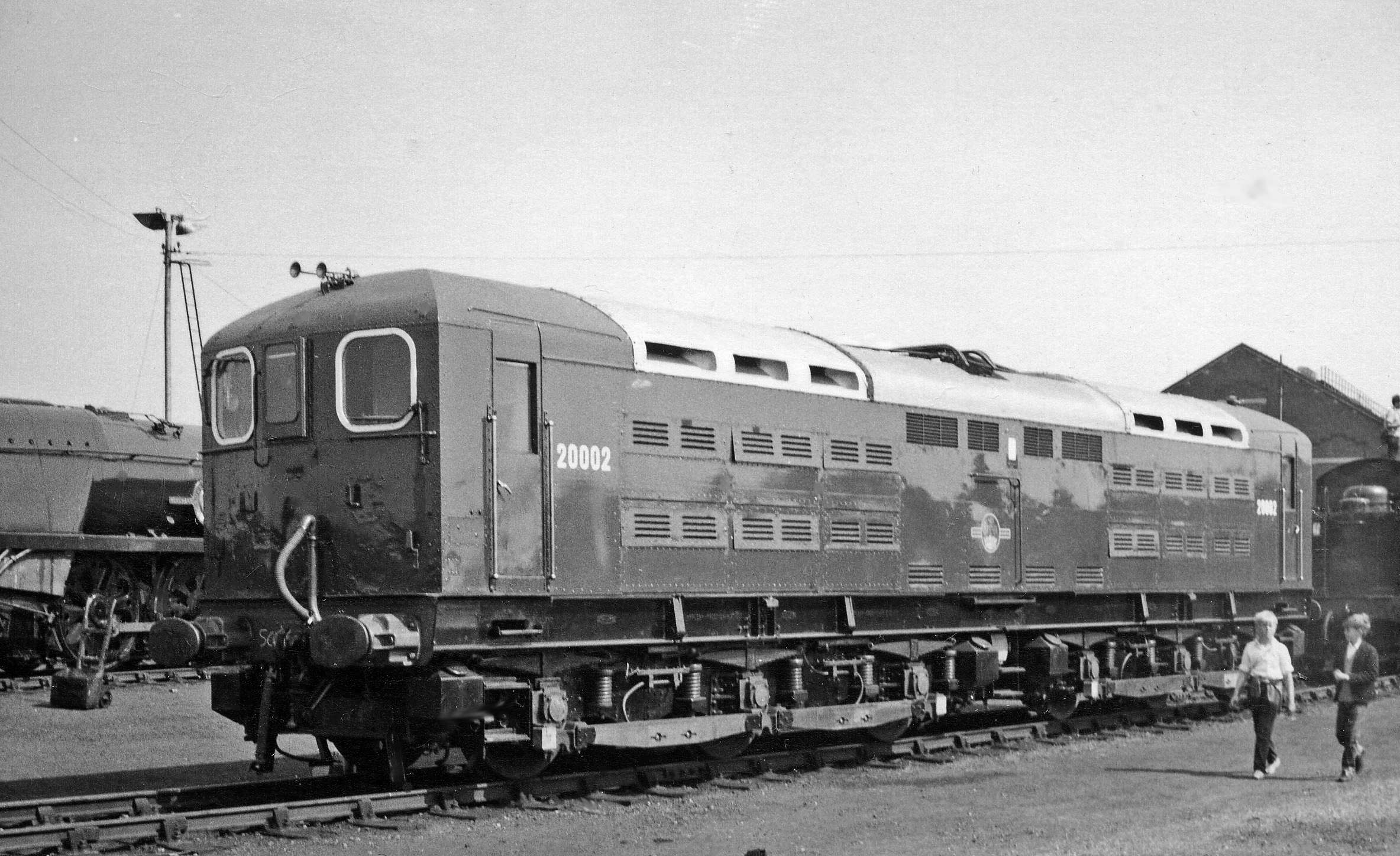
- 20002 at the Eastleigh Works Open Day in 1964
Type and origin
- Power type: Electric
- Builder: SR Ashford Works (2); BR Brighton Works (1)
- Build date: 1941, 1945, 1948
- Total produced: 3
Specifications
- Configuration
  - UIC: Co′Co′
  - Commonwealth: Co-Co
- Gauge: 4 ft 8 1/2 in (1,435 mm) standard gauge
- Wheel diameter: 3 ft 6 in (1,067 mm)
- Loco weight: 20001/2: 99.70 long tons (101 t; 112 short tons); 20003: 104.70 long tons (106 t; 117 short tons)
- Electric system/s: 660–750 V DC Third rail (mainline); Catenary (sidings)
- Current pickups: Contact shoe (mainline), Pantograph (sidings)
- Traction motors: English Electric 245, 6 off
- Train heating: Steam
- Loco brake: Vacuum, Air, Electro-Pneumatic
- Train brakes: Dual
Performance figures
- Maximum speed: 75 mph (121 km/h)
- Power output: 1,470 hp (1,100 kW)
- Tractive effort: 20001/2: 40,000 lbf (178 kN); 20003: 45,000 lbf (200 kN)
Career
- Operators: Southern Railway; → British Railways
- Class: SR: CC; BR: 70
- Power class: BR: 7P5F
- Numbers: SR: CC1, CC2; BR: 20001–20003
- Withdrawn: 1968
- Disposition: All scrapped in 1969

The British Rail Class 70 was a class of three third rail Co-Co electric locomotives. The initial two were built by the Southern Railway (SR) at Ashford Works in 1940–41 and 1945 and were numbered CC1 and CC2 - the Southern Railway latterly preferring French practice for locomotive numbers which also gave an indication of the wheel arrangement. Electrical equipment was designed by Alfred Raworth and the body and bogies by Oliver Bulleid. CC2 was modified slightly from the original design by C. M. Cock who had succeeded Raworth as electrical engineer. The third was built by British Railways in 1948 and numbered 20003.

== Southern Railway nos. CC1 and CC2 ==
Externally, it was clear that the cab design was greatly influenced by the SR's experience with the 2HAL electric multiple unit (EMU) design. It has even been suggested that this was because the jigs for the welded cabs already existed and thus made for fast and cheap construction. At the outbreak of war in 1939, most construction projects were put on hold in favour of the war effort. Construction of CC1 and CC2 was exempted from this, because of promised savings in labour and fuel over steam locomotives. Construction was not smooth, however, and was brought to a halt several times, due to shortage of resources. After nationalisation in 1948, British Railways renumbered them 20001 and 20002 respectively.

== British Railways no. 20003 ==
The third member of the class, 20003 from new, was built at Eastleigh. S. B. Warder (later to become chief electrical engineer of the British Transport Commission and architect of the UK 25 kV AC overhead system still in use today) was, by then, Southern Railway's electrical engineer and he modified the design somewhat. Although counted as the same class, 20003 was markedly different externally from its two earlier sisters, being 2 in (5 cm) longer with flat 4-SUB-like cab ends, arguably a simpler (and therefore cheaper) design than the earlier two. Equipment changes, though, added 5 tons to the earlier 100-ton design.

== Head codes ==
CC1 and CC2 locomotives were equipped with stencil head codes, but as it quickly became apparent that suitable head codes for freight workings did not exist (nor did the combination of two numbers only at that time, provide the scope) CC1 and CC2 were also fitted with six steam locomotive style discs at each end with 20003 being fitted from new so that standard codes could be displayed. With standardisation came a whole set of new two-character codes with letters as well, and all three locomotives were fitted with roller-blind two-character head codes and the discs removed.

== Technical details ==
The class soon proved capable performers. The six traction motors provided 1,470 hp (1,100 kW), allowed them to handle both 1,000 ton freight and 750 ton passenger trains with ease.

=== Booster control ===
Being much shorter than the predominant multiple units, electric locomotives can suffer from a problem known as "gapping" - becoming marooned between supplies at breaks in the electrical supply and snatching at the couplings whilst moving as they come on and off the power. The latter places undue stress on couplings and has been known to cause separations of a train. Raworth overcame this by having a motor–generator set (booster) with a large flywheel on the shaft between the two.

The traction current, instead of feeding the traction motors directly through the control assembly, powered a large motor which turned a shaft with the flywheel and fed into the generator. The output of the generator could be combined with the third rail power to reduce or boost the voltage applied to the traction motors. With the generator output polarity reversed, the control assembly could deliver around 1200 V DC by combining the generator output with the 650 V from the third rail to give positive 650 V and negative 500-600 V - leading to the nickname "boosters". The flywheel ensured the generator continued to turn whilst no current was available from the third rail, thus ensuring a continuous supply to the traction motors.

Even while stationary, Class 70 locomotives produced a noticeable droning noise due to the booster-set turning inside the body. Two booster sets were fitted in each locomotive, one for each bogie. It was not sufficient to allow the locomotives to work "off the grid" as the load on the generator whilst under power meant it would quickly consume the stored kinetic energy. They needed attentive driving, to ensure they were not brought to a halt on a gap and the booster set allowed to run down.

There were losses incurred in the conversion of electrical energy to kinetic and back again, but Raworth mitigated this in the control mechanism. Instead of having large, heavily built resistances in the power lines for the motors, the 26 taps on the controller changed resistances in the field coils of the generator. These correspondingly made the construction much lighter and more easily maintained. Instead of "burning-up" unrequired power, the controller simply altered how much power was generated.

=== Other features ===
A cross-arm pantograph was fitted to each of the three locomotives to allow them to work from overhead lines erected in some yards, (notably Hither Green marshalling yard, South East London) where it was deemed too dangerous to have third rail, with staff constantly at track level, particularly in war-time blackout. The pantograph was recessed into a cut-out on the roof when not in use, to keep within the loading gauge.

The locomotives were fitted with electrically powered train heating boilers to generate steam for train heating allowing them to work passenger trains if necessary.

== Successor and withdrawal ==
The class formed a "proof-of-concept" for booster-based electric locomotives. Although thought of as prototypes for the later Class 71, which used the same concept, the latter differed greatly in its design and construction, being based on Swiss practice.

All three were withdrawn between October 1968 and January 1969 without receiving TOPS numbers, although 20001 received BR "Rail Blue" for its final years. None were preserved.

Parts of the electrical equipment including booster generators and flywheels were salvaged and used by GEC as load simulators in its test facilities at Preston, where locomotive traction equipment was dynamically tested. Among others, traction systems for the second series of trains for the Docklands Light Railway were tested on the rig.
