= Slade discography =

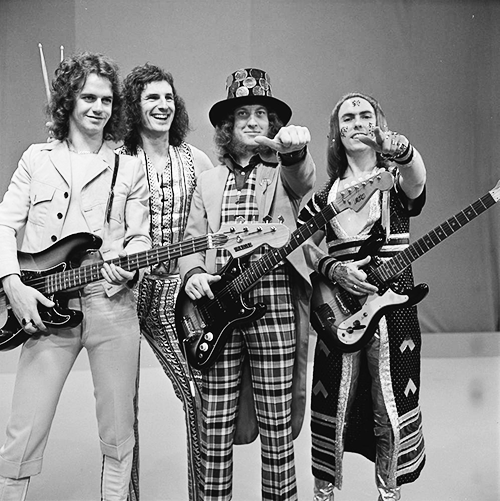
- Classic lineup of Slade in 1973
- Studio albums: 15
- Extended plays: 3
- Soundtrack albums: 1
- Live albums: 6
- Compilation albums: 10
- Singles: 56

The discography of Slade, an English rock band, consists of fifteen studio albums, fifty-seven singles, four live albums, and twelve compilation albums.

== Albums ==
=== Studio albums ===
Title	Album details	Peak chart positions										Certifications
Title	Album details	UK	AUS	AUT	CAN	FIN	GER	NED	NOR	SWE	US	Certifications
Beginnings (as Ambrose Slade) (US: Ballzy)	Released: 9 May 1969; Label: Fontana	—	—	—	—	—	—	—	—	—	—	
Play It Loud	Released: 28 November 1970; Label: Polydor	—	—	—	40	—	—	—	—	—	—	
Slayed?	Released: 1 November 1972; Label: Polydor	1	1	3	27	2	10	10	3	—	69	FIN: Gold
Old New Borrowed and Blue (US: Stomp Your Hands, Clap Your Feet)	Released: 15 February 1974; Label: Polydor	1	6	—	—	2	20	—	3	9	168	UK: Gold
Slade in Flame	Released: 29 November 1974; Label: Polydor	6	25	—	—	10	41	—	2	7	93	UK: Gold
Nobody's Fools	Released: 5 March 1976; Label: Polydor	14	—	—	—	—	—	—	—	14	—	
Whatever Happened to Slade	Released: 21 March 1977; Label: Barn	—	—	—	—	—	—	—	—	—	—	
Return to Base	Released: 1 October 1979; Label: Barn	—	—	—	—	—	—	—	—	—	—	
We'll Bring the House Down	Released: 13 March 1981; Label: Cheapskate	25	—	—	—	—	—	—	—	—	—	
Till Deaf Do Us Part	Released: 13 November 1981; Label: RCA	68	—	—	—	—	—	—	—	—	—	
The Amazing Kamikaze Syndrome	Released: 9 December 1983; Label: RCA	49	50	17	—	20	9	2	1	—		
Keep Your Hands Off My Power Supply (North American version of The Amazing Kamikaze Syndrome)	Released: 2 April 1984; Label: CBS	—	—	—	26	—	—	—	—	—	33	CAN: Gold
Rogues Gallery	Released: 29 March 1985; Label: RCA	60	—	—	64	26	38	—	5	27	132	
Crackers: The Christmas Party Album	Released: 18 November 1985; Label: Telstar	34	—	—	—	—	—	—	—	—	—	UK: Gold
You Boyz Make Big Noize	Released: 27 April 1987; Label: RCA	98	—	—	—	—	—	—	12	—	—	
Keep On Rockin' (as Slade II)	Released: November 1994; Label: Play That Beat!	—	—	—	—	—	—	—	—	—	—	
"—" denotes items that did not chart or were not released in that territory.

=== Compilation albums ===
Title	Album details	Peak chart positions										Certifications
Title	Album details	UK	AUS	AUT	CAN	FIN	GER	NED	NOR	SWE	US	Certifications
Coz I Luv You	Released: March 1972; Label: Polydor	—	29	—	—	—	—	10	—	—	—	
Sladest	Released: 28 September 1973; Label: Polydor	1	3	10	75	1	3	—	4	12	129	UK: Gold
The Story of Slade	Released: 1977; Label: Barn Records	—	—	—	—	—	—	—	—	—	—	
Slade Smashes! (AUS: The Very Best of Slade)	Released: 1 November 1980; Label: Polydor	21	48	—	—	—	—	—	—	—	—	UK: Gold
Slades Greats	Released: 12 May 1984; Label: Polydor	89	70	—	—	—	—	—	—	—	—	
The Slade Collection 81–87	Released: March 1991; Label: RCA/BMG	—	—	—	—	—	—	—	—	—	—	
Wall of Hits	Released: 11 November 1991; Label: Polydor	34	—	—	—	—	44	65	—	—	—	UK: Silver
The Slade Collection Vol. 2, 79–87	Released: December 1993; Label: RCA/BMG/Polydor	—	—	—	—	—	—	—	—	—	—	
The Genesis of Slade	Released: 3 March 1996; Label: The Music Corporation	—	—	—	—	—	—	—	—	—	—	
Feel the Noize – Greatest Hits	Released: February 1997; Label: Polydor	19	—	—	—	—	—	—	10	—	—	UK: Gold
Get Yer Boots On: The Best of Slade	Released: 23 March 2004; Label: Shout! Factory	—	—	—	—	—	—	—	—	—	—	
The Very Best of Slade	Released: 28 November 2005; Label: Polydor	39	—	—	—	—	—	—	—	—	—	UK: Gold
B-Sides	Released: 5 March 2007; Label: Salvo	—	—	—	—	—	—	—	—	—	—	
Rockers	Released: 17 April 2007; Label: Salvo	—	—	—	—	—	—	—	—	—	—	
In for a Penny: Raves & Faves	Released: 17 April 2007; Label: Shout! Factory	—	—	—	—	—	—	—	—	—	—	
Merry Xmas Everybody: Party Hits	Released: 23 November 2009; Label: Universal	151	—	—	—	—	—	—	—	—	—	
Cum On Feel the Hitz: The Best of Slade	Released: 25 September 2020; Label: BMG	8	—	54	—	35	—	—	—	—	—	
"—" denotes items that did not chart or were not released in that territory.

=== Box sets ===
Title	Album details
The Slade Box	Released: 2 October 2006; Label: Salvo
When Slade Rocked the World	Released: 13 November 2015; Label: Salvo
Feel the Noize – The Singlez Box!	Released: 31 May 2019; Label: BMG
All the World Is a Stage	Released: September 2022; Label: BMG

=== Live albums ===
Title	Album details	Peak chart positions								
Title	Album details	UK	AUS	AUT	BEL	CAN	FIN	GER	NOR	US
Slade Alive!	Released: 24 March 1972; Label: Polydor	2	1	8	2	77	5	25	18	158
Slade Alive, Vol. 2	Released: 20 October 1978; Label: Barn	—	—	—	—	—	—	—	—	—
Slade on Stage	Released: 3 December 1982; Label: RCA	58	—	—	—	—	—	—	—	—
Slade Alive! – The Live Anthology	Released: 21 August 2006; Label: Salvo	191	—	—	100	—	—	—	—	—
Live at the BBC	Released: 28 September 2009; Label: Salvo	—	—	—	—	—	—	—	—	—
Alive! At Reading	Released: 15 September 2023; Label: BMG	—	—	—	—	—	—	—	—	—
Live at the New Victoria Theatre, London 1975	Released: February 2024; Label: BMG	—	—	—	—	—	—	—	—	—
"—" denotes items that did not chart or were not released in that territory.

== Extended plays ==
Title	Album details	Peak chart positions
Title	Album details	UK
Six of the Best	Released: 24 May 1980; Label: Super	—
Alive at Reading	Released: 26 September 1980; Label: Cheapskate	44
Xmas Ear Bender	Released: 5 November 1980; Label: Cheapskate	70
"—" denotes items that did not chart or were not released in that territory.

== Singles ==
Year	Title	Peak chart positions										Certifications	Parent album
Year	Title	UK	AUS	BEL	CAN	FIN	GER	IRE	NED	NOR	US	Certifications	Parent album
1966	"You Better Run" (as The N' Betweens)	—	—	—	—	—	—	—	—	—	—		Non-album single
1969	"Genesis" (as Ambrose Slade)	—	—	—	—	—	—	—	—	—	—		Beginnings
1969	"Wild Winds Are Blowing" (as The Slade)	—	—	—	—	—	—	—	—	—	—		Non-album single
1970	"Shape of Things to Come"	—	—	—	—	—	—	—	—	—	—		Play It Loud
1970	"Know Who You Are" (UK only)	—	—	—	—	—	—	—	—	—	—		Play It Loud
1971	"Get Down and Get with It"	16	78	30	—	—	34	—	4	—	—		Non-album singles
1971	"Coz I Luv You"	1	7	7	—	25	9	1	2	—	—		Non-album singles
1971	"Look Wot You Dun"	4	43	12	—	27	14	6	2	—	—		Non-album singles
1972	"Take Me Bak 'Ome"	1	11	11	—	—	10	4	5	—	97	UK: Silver	Non-album singles
1972	"Mama Weer All Crazee Now"	1	14	11	—	11	6	1	7	3	76		Slayed?
1972	"Gudbuy T'Jane"	2	11	5	72	7	3	2	4	7	68	UK: Silver	Slayed?
1973	"Cum On Feel the Noize"	1	12	5	—	10	8	1	6	—	98	UK: Silver	Non-album singles
1973	"Skweeze Me, Pleeze Me"	1	39	11	—	4	3	1	6	3	—	UK: Silver	Non-album singles
1973	"Let the Good Times Roll" (US only)	—	—	—	—	—	—	—	—	—	114		Slayed?
1973	"My Friend Stan"	2	44	7	—	10	5	1	10	5	—	UK: Silver	Old New Borrowed and Blue
1973	"Move Over" (Japan only)	—	—	—	—	—	—	—	—	—	—		Slayed?
1973	"Merry Xmas Everybody"	1	55	3	—	19	4	1	3	4	—	UK: 2× Platinum	Non-album single
1974	"Good Time Gals" (US only)	—	—	—	—	—	—	—	—	—	—		Old New Borrowed and Blue
1974	"Everyday"	3	13	22	—	7	17	4	4	3	—	UK: Silver	Old New Borrowed and Blue
1974	"When the Lights Are Out" (US only)	—	—	—	—	—	—	—	—	—	—		Old New Borrowed and Blue
1974	"The Bangin' Man"	3	48	18	—	—	7	3	18	4	—	UK: Silver	Non-album single
1974	"Far Far Away"	2	17	24	—	12	8	2	13	1	—	UK: Silver	Slade in Flame
1975	"How Does It Feel"	15	—	—	—	—	36	11	—	—	—		Slade in Flame
1975	"Thanks for the Memory (Wham Bam Thank You Mam)"	7	—	—	—	15	13	3	16	5	—		Non-album single
1975	"In for a Penny"	11	—	—	—	—	—	12	—	—	—		Nobody's Fool
1976	"Let's Call It Quits"	11	—	—	—	—	—	—	—	—	—		Nobody's Fool
1976	"Nobody's Fool"	— (Note: This single did not enter the UK Singles Chart, but did reach number three in the UK Star Breakers Chart.)	—	—	—	—	—	26	—	—	—		Nobody's Fool
1977	"Gypsy Roadhog"	48	—	—	—	—	—	—	—	—	—		Whatever Happened to Slade
1977	"Burning in the Heat of Love"	—	—	—	—	—	—	—	—	—	—		Non-album singles
1977	"My Baby Left Me/ That's All Right"	32	—	—	—	—	—	—	—	—	—		Non-album singles
1978	"Give Us a Goal"	— (Note: This single did not enter the UK Singles Chart, but did reach number 70 in Gallup's National Top 100 Singles chart.)	—	—	—	—	—	—	—	—	—		Non-album singles
1978	"Rock 'n' Roll Bolero"	—	—	—	—	—	—	—	—	—	—		Non-album singles
1978	"It's Alright Buy Me" (France only)	—	—	—	—	—	—	—	—	—	—		Non-album singles
1979	"Ginny, Ginny"	—	—	—	—	—	—	—	—	—	—		Return to Base
1979	"I'm a Rocker" (Belgium only)	—	—	—	—	—	—	—	—	—	—		Return to Base
1979	"Sign of the Times" (UK only)	—	—	—	—	—	—	—	—	—	—		Return to Base
1979	"Okey Cokey" (UK only)	— (Note: This single did not enter the UK Singles Chart, but did reach number 96 in the Record Business The Singles Chart.)	—	—	—	—	—	—	—	—	—		Non-album single
1981	"We'll Bring the House Down"	10	—	—	—	—	—	11	—	—	—		We'll Bring the House Down
1981	"Wheels Ain't Coming Down" (UK only)	60	—	—	—	—	—	—	—	—	—		We'll Bring the House Down
1981	"Knuckle Sandwich Nancy" (UK only)	— (Note: This single did not enter the UK Singles Chart, but did reach number 101 in the Record Business Bubbling Under Singles chart.)	—	—	—	—	—	—	—	—	—		Till Deaf Do Us Part
1981	"Lock Up Your Daughters"	29	—	—	—	—	—	—	19	—	—		Till Deaf Do Us Part
1982	"Ruby Red" (UK only)	51	—	—	—	—	—	—	—	—	—		Till Deaf Do Us Part
1982	"Rock and Roll Preacher" (Germany only)	—	—	—	—	—	49	—	—	—	—		Till Deaf Do Us Part
1982	"(And Now the Waltz) C'est La Vie"	50	—	—	—	—	—	—	—	—	—		The Amazing Kamikaze Syndrome
1983	"My Oh My"	2	65	4	31	27	4	3	9	1	37	UK: Gold	The Amazing Kamikaze Syndrome
1983	"Cum On Feel the Noize" (re-issue)	98	—	—	—	—	—	—	—	—	—		Non-album single
1984	"Run Runaway"	7	17	33	13	—	19	8	—	7	20		The Amazing Kamikaze Syndrome; Keep Your Hands Off My Power Supply
1984	"All Join Hands"	15	—	—	—	—	—	9	—	—	—		Rogues Gallery
1985	"7 Year Bitch"	60	—	—	—	—	39	—	—	—	—		Rogues Gallery
1985	"Myzsterious Mizster Jones"	50	—	—	—	—	—	—	—	—	—		Rogues Gallery
1985	"Little Sheila"	—	—	—	50	—	—	—	—	—	86		Rogues Gallery
1985	"Do You Believe in Miracles"	54	—	—	—	—	—	—	—	—	—		Crackers: The Christmas Party Album
1987	"Still the Same"	73	—	—	—	—	—	—	—	—	—		You Boyz Make Big Noize
1987	"That's What Friends Are For"	95	—	—	—	—	—	—	—	—	—		You Boyz Make Big Noize
1987	"Ooh La La in L.A."	—	—	—	—	—	—	—	—	—	—		You Boyz Make Big Noize
1987	"You Boyz Make Big Noize" (UK only)	94	—	—	—	—	—	—	—	—	—		Non-album single
1987	"We Won't Give In" (UK only)	121	—	—	—	—	—	—	—	—	—		You Boyz Make Big Noize
1988	"Let's Dance '88" (UK only)	152	—	—	—	—	—	—	—	—	—		Non-album single
1991	"Radio Wall of Sound"	21	—	21	—	—	—	30	22	—	—		Wall of Hits
1991	"Universe"	76	—	—	—	—	—	—	—	—	—		Wall of Hits
1998	"Merry Xmas Everybody '98 Remix" (Slade vs Flush)	30	—	—	—	—	—	—	—	—	—		Non-album singles
2013	"Everyday" (re-issue)	69	—	—	—	—	—	—	—	—	—		Non-album singles
"—" denotes items that did not chart or were not released in that territory.

=== Promotional only singles ===
Year	Single	Album	Notes
1966	"Security"	Non-album single	US only, as The In-Be-Tweens
1972	"Hear Me Calling"	Slade Alive!	UK only
1972	"The Whole World's Goin' Crazee"	Slayed?	UK 7" flexi disc given free with Music Scene magazine
1980	"Night Starvation"	Six of the Best	UK only
1984	"Slam the Hammer Down"	Keep Your Hands Off My Power Supply	America only
1987	"Ooh La La in L.A."	You Boyz Make Big Noize	America / Europe (excluding UK)

== "Merry Xmas Everybody" single ==
"Merry Xmas Everybody" was annually re-released for most of the eighties in the UK.

Since the 21st century, chart rules changed in many territories to allow downloads of old singles to re-enter the singles charts.

	1973	1980	1981	1982	1983	1984	1985	1986	1989	1990	1991	1998	2006	2007	2008	2009	2010	2011	2012	2013	2014	2015	2016	2017	2018	2019	2020	2021	2022	2023	2024	2025
UK	1	70	32	67	20	47	48	71	99	93	—	—	21	20	32	35	50	33	35	49	55	55	30	16	17	19	17	21	26	32	26	26
IRE	1	—	—	—	—	18	—	—	—	—	—	—	37	—	—	—	—	49	48	67	—	75	68	—	—	—	—	34	41			
NED	7	—	—	—	—	—	—	—	—	—	73	—	—	—	—	—	—	—	—	—	99	—	—	42	61	67	—	—	—			
SCO	—	—	—	—	—	—	—	—	—	—	—	31	21	—	—	40	54	31	35	46	44	68	73	70	61	51	58	59	60			
GER	4	—	—	—	—	—	—	—	—	—	—	—	—	—	80	—	—	—	—	—	—	—	—	96	—	65	—	—	—			

== Videography ==
=== Videos ===
- Slade in Flame (1975)
- Wall of Hits (1991)
- Inside Slade – The Singles 1971–1991 (2004)
- The Very Best of Slade (2005)
- Slade Alive! – The Ultimate Critical Review (2006)
- Slade – Live at Koko (2015)

=== Music videos ===
Year	Video
1969	"Mad Dog Cole"
1969	"Wild Winds Are Blowing"
1971	"Get Down and Get With It"
1971	"Look Wot You Dun"
1972	"Gudbuy T'Jane"
1973	"Cum On Feel the Noize"
1973	"My Friend Stan"
1974	"Far Far Away"
1975	"Thanks for the Memory (Wham Bam Thank You Mam)"
1976	"Let's Call It Quits"
1976	"Nobody's Fool"
1977	"My Baby Left Me – That's All Right"
1978	"Give Us a Goal"
1981	"We'll Bring The House Down"
1981	"Wheels Ain't Coming Down"
1981	"Lock Up Your Daughters"
1982	"Ruby Red"
1983	"My Oh My"
1984	"Run Runaway"
1984	"All Join Hands"
1985	"7 Year Bitch"
1985	"Myzsterious Mizster Jones"
1985	"Little Sheila"
1985	"Do You Believe in Miracles"
1991	"Radio Wall of Sound"
1991	"Universe"

== See also ==
- List of songs recorded by Slade
