= List of songs recorded by Slade =

This is a list of songs recorded and performed by Slade.

== Songs ==
Title	Year	Album	Author(s)
(And Now the Waltz) C'est La Vie	1982	The Amazing Kamikaze Syndrome / Keep Your Hands Off My Power Supply	Noddy Holder, Jim Lea
7 Year Bitch	1985	Rogues Gallery	Holder, Lea
9 to 5	1980	Six of the Best (Extended Play)	Holder, Lea
A Night to Remember	1981	Till Deaf Do Us Part	Holder, Lea
Ain't Got No Heart	1969	Beginnings (as Ambrose Slade)	Frank Zappa
All Join Hands	1984	Rogues Gallery	Holder, Lea
All the World Is a Stage	1976	Nobody's Fools	Holder, Lea
Angelina	1970	Play It Loud	Neil Innes
Auld Lang Syne / You'll Never Walk Alone	1985	Crackers – The Christmas Party Album	Richard Rodgers, Oscar Hammerstein
Be	1977	Whatever Happened to Slade	Holder, Lea
Big Apple Blues	1977	Whatever Happened to Slade	Holder, Lea
Born to Be Wild	1969	Beginnings (as Ambrose Slade)	Mars Bonfire
Boyz (Instrumental)	1987	B-Side of "You Boyz Make Big Noize" single	Holder, Lea
Burning in the Heat of Love	1977	Non-album Single	Holder, Lea
Can You Just Imagine	1975	B-Side of "In for a Penny" single	Holder, Lea
Candidate	1972	B-Side of "Look Wot You Dun" single	Lea, Don Powell
Chakeeta	1979	Return to Base	Holder, Lea
Cheap 'n' Nasty Luv	1983	The Amazing Kamikaze Syndrome / Keep Your Hands Off My Power Supply	Holder, Lea
C'mon C'mon	1970	B-Side of "Shape of Things to Come" single	Holder, Lea
Cocky Rock Boys (Rule O.K.)	1983	The Amazing Kamikaze Syndrome	Holder, Lea
Coloured Rain	1970	Live at the BBC	Steve Winwood, Chris Wood, Jim Capaldi
Coming Home	1970	Live at the BBC	Eric Clapton, Bonnie Bramlett
Could I	1970	Play It Loud	James Griffin, Robb Royer
Coz I Luv You	1971	Non-album Single	Holder, Lea
Cum On Feel the Noize	1973	Non-album Single	Holder, Lea
Daddio	1978	B-Side of "Give Us a Goal" single	Holder, Lea
Dapple Rose	1970	Play It Loud	Lea, Powell
Darling Be Home Soon	1972	Slade Alive! (live only)	John Sebastian
Dead Men Tell No Tales	1977	Whatever Happened to Slade	Holder, Lea
Delighted to See You	1967	Private Acetate (as The 'N Betweens)	Pete Dello
Did Ya Mama Ever Tell Ya?	1976	Nobody's Fools	Holder, Lea
Dirty Joker	1970	Play It Loud	Lea, Powell
Dizzy Mamma	1979	We'll Bring the House Down	Holder, Lea
Do the Dirty	1976	Nobody's Fools	Holder, Lea
Do They Know It's Christmas (Feed the World)	1985	Crackers – The Christmas Party Album	Bob Geldof, Midge Ure
Do We Still Do It	1974	Old New Borrowed and Blue	Holder, Lea
Do You Believe in Miracles	1985	Crackers – The Christmas Party Album	Holder, Lea
Do You Want Me	1971	B-Side of "Get Down and Get With It" single	Dave Hill, Holder
Dogs of Vengeance	1977	Whatever Happened to Slade	Holder, Lea
Don't Blame Me	1973	Old New Borrowed and Blue	Holder, Lea
Don't Talk to Me About Love	1987	B-Side of "Still the Same" single	Holder, Lea
Don't Tame a Hurricane	1983	Keep Your Hands Off My Power Supply	Holder, Lea
Don't Waste Your Time (Back Seat Star)	1979	Return to Base	Holder, Lea
Everybody's Next One	1969	Beginnings (as Ambrose Slade)	John Kay, Gabriel Mekler
Everyday	1974	Old New Borrowed and Blue	Holder, Lea
Evil Witchman	1966	B-Side of "You Better Run" single (as The 'N Betweens)	Kim Fowley, Powell, Hill, Holder, Lea
Far Far Away	1974	Slade in Flame	Holder, Lea
Find Yourself a Rainbow	1974	Old New Borrowed and Blue	Holder, Lea
Fly Me High	1969	Beginnings (as Ambrose Slade)	Justin Hayward
Fools Go Crazy	1987	You Boyz Make Big Noize	Holder, Lea
Forest Full of Needles	1977	B-Side of "Gypsy Roadhog" single	Holder, Lea
Funk Punk & Junk	1982	B-Side of "Ruby Red" single	Holder, Lea
Genesis	1969	Beginnings (as Ambrose Slade)	Hill, Holder, Lea, Powell
Get Down and Get With It	1971	Non-album Single	Bobby Marchan
Get on Up	1976	Nobody's Fools	Holder, Lea
Getting Better	1970	Live at the BBC	John Lennon, Paul McCartney
Ginny, Ginny	1979	Return to Base	Holder, Lea
Give Us a Goal	1978	Non-album Single	Holder, Lea
Good Golly Miss Molly	1972	Live at the BBC	John Marascalco, Robert "Bumps" Blackwell
Good Time Gals	1974	Old New Borrowed and Blue	Holder, Lea
Gospel According to Rasputin	1971	B-Side of "Get Down and Get With It" Single	Hill, Holder
Gotta Go Home	1987	B-Side of "Still the Same"	Holder, Lea
Gudbuy Gudbuy	1972	Slayed?	Holder, Lea
Gudbuy T'Jane	1972	Slayed?	Holder, Lea
Gypsy Roadhog	1977	Whatever Happened to Slade	Holder, Lea
Harmony	1985	Rogues Gallery	Holder, Lea
Hear Me Calling	1972	Slade Alive! (live only)/Sladest (2011 Salvo Remaster) (studio acetate)	Alvin Lee
Heaven Knows	1974	Slade in Flame	Holder, Lea
Here's To... (The New Year)	1984	Crackers – The Christmas Party Album	Holder, Lea
Hey Ho Wish You Well	1985	Rogues Gallery	Holder, Lea
Hi Ho Silver Lining	1985	Crackers – The Christmas Party Album	Scott English; Larry Weiss
High and Dry	1983	The Amazing Kamikaze Syndrome / Keep Your Hands Off My Power Supply	Holder, Lea
Hold On to Your Hats	1979	Return to Base / We'll Bring the House Down	Holder, Lea
Hold Tight	1966	The Genesis of Slade (as The 'N Betweens)	Ken Howard, Alan Blaikley
How Can It Be	1974	Old New Borrowed and Blue	Holder, Lea
How Does It Feel	1974	Slade in Flame	Holder, Lea
How D'You Ride	1972	Slayed?	Holder, Lea
I Don' Mind	1972	Slayed?	Holder, Lea
I Remember	1970	Play It Loud	Lea, Powell
I Win, You Lose	1985	Rogues Gallery	Holder, Lea
I Won't Let It 'Appen Agen	1972	Slayed?	Lea
If This World Were Mine	1969	Beginnings (as Ambrose Slade)	Marvin Gaye
I'll Be There	1985	Rogues Gallery	Holder, Lea
I'm a Rocker	1979	Return to Base / We'll Bring the House Down	Chuck Berry
I'm a Talker	1976	Nobody's Fools	Holder, Lea
I'm Mad	1979	Return to Base	Holder, Lea
I'm Mee, I'm Now, an' That's Orl	1973	B-Side of "Cum On Feel the Noize" single	Holder, Lea
In for a Penny	1975	Nobody's Fools	Holder, Lea
In Like a Shot from My Gun	1972	Slade Alive! (live only)	Holder, Lea, Powell
In the Doghouse	1983	The Amazing Kamikaze Syndrome / Keep Your Hands Off My Power Supply	Holder, Lea
It Ain't Love but It Ain't Bad	1977	Whatever Happened to Slade	Holder, Lea
It's Alright Buy Me	1978	B-Side of "Rock 'n' Roll Bolero" single	Holder, Lea
It's Alright Ma, It's Only Witchcraft	1970	Live at the BBC	Ashley Hutchings, Richard Thompson
It's Hard Having Fun Nowadays	1987	You Boyz Make Big Noize	Holder, Lea
It's Your Body Not Your Mind	1981	Till Deaf Do Us Part	Holder, Lea
Journey to the Centre of Your Mind	1969	Beginnings (as Ambrose Slade)	Ted Nugent, Steve Farmer
Just Want a Little Bit	1974	Old New Borrowed and Blue	John Thornton, Ralph Bass, Fats Washington, Piney Brown, Sylvester Thompson
Keep On Rocking	1972	Slade Alive! (live only)	Hill, Holder, Lea, Powell
Keep Your Hands Off My Power Supply	1983	Keep Your Hands Off My Power Supply	Holder, Lea
Kill 'Em at the Hot Club Tonite	1973	B-Side of "Skweeze Me, Pleeze Me" single	Holder, Lea
Knocking Nails into My House	1969	Beginnings (as Ambrose Slade)	Jeff Lynne
Know Who You Are	1970	Play It Loud	Hill, Holder, Lea, Powell
Knuckle Sandwich Nancy	1981	Till Deaf Do Us Part	Holder, Lea
L.A. Jinx	1976	Nobody's Fools	Holder, Lea
Lady Be Good	1972	Live at the BBC	George Gershwin, Ira Gershwin
Lay It Down	1974	Slade in Flame	Holder, Lea
Lay Your Love on the Line	1991	B-Side of "Radio Wall of Sound" single	Hill, Bill Hunt
Leave Them Girls Alone	1985	B-Side of "7 Year Bitch" single	Holder, Lea
Lemme Love into Ya	1979	Return to Base / We'll Bring the House Down	Holder, Lea
Let the Good Times Roll / Feel So Fine	1972	Slayed?	Leonard Lee
Let the Rock Roll Out of Control	1981	Till Deaf Do Us Part	Holder, Lea
Let's Call It Quits	1976	Nobody's Fools	Holder, Lea
Let's Dance	1985	Crackers – The Christmas Party Album	Jim Lee
Let's Have a Party	1985	Crackers – The Christmas Party Album	Phil Baxter, Cliff Friend, Joe Haynes
Lightning Never Strikes Twice	1977	Whatever Happened to Slade	Holder, Lea
Little Sheila	1985	Rogues Gallery	Holder, Lea
Lock Up Your Daughters	1981	Till Deaf Do Us Part	Holder, Lea
Look at Last Nite	1972	Slayed?	Holder, Lea
Look Wot You Dun	1973	Non-album Single	Holder, Lea, Powell
Love Is Like a Rock	1987	You Boyz Make Big Noize	Mark Avsec, Donnie Iris, Marty Lee Hoenes, Albritton McClain, Kevin Valentine
Mad Dog Cole	1969	Beginnings (as Ambrose Slade)	Hill, Holder, Lea, Powell
Mama Nature Is a Rocker	1985	B-Side of "Myzsterious Mizster Jones" single	Holder, Lea
Mama Weer All Crazee Now	1972	Slayed?	Holder, Lea
Man Who Speeks Evil	1972	B-Side of "Mama Weer All Crazee Now" single	Lea, Powell
Martha My Dear	1969	Beginnings (as Ambrose Slade)	John Lennon, Paul McCartney
Me and the Boys	1987	You Boyz Make Big Noize	Holder, Lea
Merry Xmas Everybody	1973	Non-album Single	Holder, Lea
M'Hat M'Coat	1981	Till Deaf Do Us Part	Hill
Miles Out to Sea	1974	Old New Borrowed and Blue	Holder, Lea
Move Over	1972	Slayed?	Janis Joplin
My Baby Left Me but That's Alright Mama	1977	Non-album Single	Arthur Crudup
My Baby's Got It	1979	Return to Base / We'll Bring the House Down	Holder, Lea
My Friend Stan	1973	Old New Borrowed and Blue	Holder, Lea
My Life Is Natural	1971	B-Side of "Coz I Luv You" single	Holder
My Oh My	1983	The Amazing Kamikaze Syndrome / Keep Your Hands Off My Power Supply	Holder, Lea
My Town	1973	Old New Borrowed and Blue	Holder, Lea
Myzsterious Mizster Jones	1985	Rogues Gallery	Holder, Lea
Need	1966	The Genesis of Slade (as The 'N Betweens)	Unknown
Night Starvation	1980	We'll Bring the House Down	Holder, Lea
Nights in White Satin	1970	Live at the BBC	Justin Hayward
Nobody's Fool	1976	Nobody's Fools	Holder, Lea
Not Tonight Josephine	1979	B-Side of "Sign of the Times" single	Holder, Lea
Nut Bolts and Screws	1979	Return to Base / We'll Bring the House Down	Holder, Lea
O.H.M.S.	1977	B-Side of "My Baby Left Me but That's Alright Mama" single	Holder, Lea
O.K. Yesterday Was Yesterday	1974	Slade in Flame	Holder, Lea
Okey Cokey	1979	Non-album Single	Jimmy Kennedy
Omaha	1970	Live at the BBC	Skip Spence
One Eyed Jacks with Moustaches	1977	Whatever Happened to Slade	Holder, Lea
One Way Hotel	1969	Play It Loud	Holder, Lea, Powell
Ooh La La in L.A.	1987	You Boyz Make Big Noize	Holder, Lea
Pack Up Your Troubles	1976	Nobody's Fools	Holder, Lea
Pity the Mother	1969	Beginnings (as Ambrose Slade)	Holder, Lea
Pouk Hill	1970	Play It Loud	Holder, Lea, Powell
Radio Wall of Sound	1991	Non-album Single	Lea
Raining in My Champagne	1975	B-Side of "Thanks for the Memory (Wham Bam Thank You Mam)" single	Holder, Lea
Raven	1970	Play It Loud	Holder, Lea, Powell
Razzle Dazzle Man	1983	The Amazing Kamikaze Syndrome	Holder, Lea
Ready Steady Kids	1977	B-Side of "Burning in the Heat of Love" single	Holder, Lea
Ready to Explode	1983	The Amazing Kamikaze Syndrome / Keep Your Hands Off My Power Supply	Holder, Lea
Red Hot	1991	B-Side of "Universe" single	Hill, Bill Hunt
Roach Daddy	1969	Beginnings (as Ambrose Slade)	Hill, Holder, Lea, Powell
Rock and Roll Preacher (Hallelujah I'm on Fire)	1981	Till Deaf Do Us Part	Holder, Lea
Rock 'n' Roll Bolero	1978	Non-album Single	Holder, Lea
Ruby Red	1981	Till Deaf Do Us Part	Holder, Lea
Run Runaway	1983	The Amazing Kamikaze Syndrome / Keep Your Hands Off My Power Supply	Holder, Lea
Santa Claus Is Coming to Town	1985	Crackers – The Christmas Party Album	John Frederick Coots, Haven Gillespie
Scratch My Back	1976	Nobody's Fools	Holder, Lea
Security	1966	Non-album Promotional Single (as The 'N Betweens)	Otis Redding
See Us Here	1970	Play It Loud	Holder, Lea, Powell
Shape of Things to Come	1970	Play It Loud	Barry Mann, Cynthia Weil
She Brings Out the Devil in Me	1981	Till Deaf Do Us Part	Holder, Lea
She Did It to Me	1974	B-Side of "The Bangin' Man"	Holder, Lea
She's Got the Lot	1977	Whatever Happened to Slade	Holder, Lea
She's Heavy	1987	You Boyz Make Big Noize	Holder, Lea
Sign of the Times	1979	Return to Base	Holder, Lea
Sing Shout (Knock Yourself Out)	1987	You Boyz Make Big Noize	Holder, Lea
Skweeze Me, Pleeze Me	1973	Non-album Single	Holder, Lea
Slam the Hammer Down	1983	The Amazing Kamikaze Syndrome / Keep Your Hands Off My Power Supply	Holder, Lea
So Far So Good	1974	Slade in Flame	Holder, Lea
Somethin' Else / Pistol Packin' Mama / Keep a Rollin'	1980	Alive at Reading '80 (live)	Bobby Cochran; Al Bexter; Holder; Hill; Lea; Powell
Standin' on the Corner	1974	Slade in Flame	Holder, Lea
Still the Same	1987	You Boyz Make Big Noize	Holder, Lea
Summer Song (Wishing You Were Here)	1974	Slade in Flame	Holder, Lea
Sweet Box	1970	Play It Loud	Lea, Powell
Take Me Bak 'Ome	1972	Non-album Single	Holder; Lea
Thanks for the Memory (Wham Bam Thank You Mam)	1975	Non-album Single	Holder, Lea
That Was No Lady That Was My Wife	1981	Till Deaf Do Us Part	Holder, Lea
That's What Friends Are For	1987	You Boyz Make Big Noize	Holder, Lea
The Bangin' Man	1974	Non-album Single	Holder, Lea
The Roaring Silence	1987	You Boyz Make Big Noize	Holder, Lea
The Soul, the Roll and the Motion	1977	Whatever Happened to Slade	Holder, Lea
The Whole World's Goin' Crazee	1972	Slayed?	Holder
Them Kinda Monkeys Can't Swing	1974	Slade in Flame	Holder, Lea
This Girl	1974	Slade in Flame	Holder, Lea
Till Deaf Do Us Part	1981	Till Deaf Do Us Part	Holder, Lea
Till Deaf Resurrected	1981	Till Deaf Do Us Part	Holder, Lea
Time to Rock	1985	Rogues Gallery	Holder, Lea
Two Track Stereo, One Track Mind	1984	B-Side of "Run Runaway" single	Holder, Lea
Ugly Girl	1966	The Genesis of Slade (as The 'N Betweens)	Kim Fowley, Powell, Hill, Holder, Lea
Universe	1991	Non-album Single	Lea
Walking on Water, Running on Alcohol	1985	Rogues Gallery	Holder, Lea
We Won't Give In	1987	You Boyz Make Big Noize	Holder, Lea
We'll Bring the House Down	1981	We'll Bring the House Down	Holder, Lea
We're Really Gonna Raise the Roof	1974	Old New Borrowed and Blue	Holder, Lea
Wheels Ain't Coming Down	1979	Return to Base / We'll Bring the House Down	Holder, Lea
When Fantasy Calls	1977	Whatever Happened to Slade	Holder, Lea
When I'm Dancin' I Ain't Fightin'	1980	We'll Bring the House Down	Holder, Lea
When the Chips Are Down	1976	B-Side of "Let's Call It Quits" single	Holder, Lea
When the Lights Are Out	1974	Old New Borrowed and Blue	Holder, Lea
Wild Wild Party	1986	B-Side of "That's What Friends Are For" single	Holder, Lea
Wild Winds Are Blowing	1969	Non-album Single (as The Slade)	Jack Winsley, Bob Saker
Wonderin’ Y	1972	B-Side of "Take Me Bak 'Ome" single	Lea, Powell
Won't You Rock with Me	1987	You Boyz Make Big Noize	Holder, Lea
You Better Run	1966	Non-album Single (as The 'N Betweens)	Felix Cavaliere, Edward Brigatti, Jr.
You Boyz Make Big Noize	1987	Non-album Single	Holder, Lea

== Unreleased songs ==
Title	Year	Author(s)	Notes
All Join Hands (Swing Version)	1986	Holder; Lea	Unreleased Swing Version recorded shortly after Swing Version of "My Oh My". Jim Lea has stated that this recording does not exist. Noddy Holder has stated that there was a backing track waiting for vocals to be added.
Another Win	1979	Bernie Frost, Andy Miller	Recorded as a finished recording in the Return to Base sessions.
I Can't See Nobody	1978	Barry Gibb, Robin Gibb	Unreleased studio version, recorded at Starling Studios.
In Like a Shot from My Gun	1972	Holder, Lea, Powell	Rumoured studio version of live only track from Slade Alive!.
Love Is...	1987	Holder, Lea	Recorded as an unfinished demo.
Rescue Me	1987	Fontella Bass, Raynard Miner, Carl Smith	Cover of 1965 Fontella Bass song, recorded as an unfinished demo.
Respect	1991	Otis Redding	Cover of 1967 Aretha Franklin song, recorded as an unfinished demo in the "Radio Wall of Sound" / "Universe" sessions.
Shooting Me Down	1987	Holder, Lea	Originally written and demoed by Holder and Lea for Samantha Fox, then considered as a Slade track, but was ultimately recorded and released as a single by Chrome Molly in 1988. The Holder/Lea demo has surfaced on the internet.
Six Days on the Road	1976	Holder, Lea	An alternative version of "When the Chips Are Down", recorded for a radio documentary by Stuart Grundy in 1975.
This Girl (Flame Version)	1975	Holder, Lea	An alternate version of "This Girl", using different lyrics, and performed in the 1975 Slade in Flame film only.
We'll Bring the House Down (1992 Version)	1992	Holder; Lea	"House/dance-style" version of "We'll Bring the House Down", recorded during the band's final studio sessions in March 1992.

== Official Remixes ==
Title	Year Remixed	Single	Remixer
7 Year Bitch (Extended 12" Version)	1985	Available on 12" Vinyl of "7 Year Bitch" single	John Punter
Do You Believe in Miracles (Extended 12" Version)	1985	Available on 12" Vinyl of "Do You Believe in Miracles" single	Punter
Let's Dance ('88 Remix)	1988	Released as single in 1988	Jim Lea
Little Sheila (Extended 12" Version)	1985	Available on 12" Vinyl of "Little Sheila" single	Punter
Merry Xmas Everybody '98 Remix (Flush Edit)	1998	Slade vs Flush - released as a CD single in 1998	Stefan Rundquist, Sven Olson
Merry Xmas Everybody (Extended Remix Version)	1985	Available on 12" Vinyl of "Merry Xmas Everybody" 1985 re-issue single	Lea, Peter Hammond
My Oh My (12" Version)	1983	Available on 12" Vinyl of "My Oh My" single	Punter
Myzsterious Mizster Jones (Extended 12" Version)	1985	Available on 12" Vinyl of "Myzsterious Mizster Jones" single	Punter
Run Runaway (12" Version)	1984	Available on 12" Vinyl of "Run Runaway" single	Punter
Slam the Hammer Down (Hot Mix)	1984	Available on American 12" Promotional Vinyl of "Slam the Hammer Down" single	Shep Pettibone
Slam the Hammer Down (Hotter Mix)	1984	B-Side on American 12" Promotional Vinyl of "Slam the Hammer Down" single	Pettibone
Still the Same (Extended 12" Version)	1987	Available on 12" Vinyl of "Still the Same" single	Punter
That's What Friends Are For (Extended 12" Version)	1987	Available on 12" Vinyl of "That's What Friends Are For" single	Roy Thomas Baker
You Boyz Make Big Noize (Noize Remix)	1987	Available on 12" Vinyl of "You Boyz Make Big Noize" single	Lea
You Boyz Make Big Noize (USA Mix)	1987	Available on 12" Vinyl of "You Boyz Make Big Noize" single	Lea
