= The Slade Box =

The Slade Box 4 CD Anthology 1969-1991

Box set by Slade
- Released: 2 October 2006
- Genres: Glam rock, hard rock
- Label: Salvo

Slade chronology
Slade Alive! - The Live Anthology (2006)	The Slade Box 4 CD Anthology 1969-1991 (2006)	B-Sides (2007)

The Slade Box (A 4CD Anthology 1969–1991) is a four-disc box set by the British rock band Slade. It was released by Salvo on 2 October 2006.

The Slade Box contains eighty-four tracks ranging across the band's career from 1969 to 1991. A 72-page booklet was included with liner notes by Keith Altham. In 2011, the box set was re-issued by Salvo. It featured the same track listing but was packaged in a shortened case with the booklet reduced to 36 pages.

== Track listing ==
=== Disc one ===
No.	Title	Writer(s)	Length
1.	"Born to Be Wild"	Mars Bonfire	3:23
2.	"Roach Daddy"	Dave Hill, Noddy Holder, Jim Lea, Don Powell	3:03
3.	"Wild Winds Are Blowing"	Bob Saker, Jack Winsley	2:38
4.	"The Shape of Things to Come"	Barry Mann, Cynthia Weil	2:17
5.	"Know Who You Are"	Hill, Holder, Lea, Powell	2:53
6.	"Pouk Hill"	Holder, Lea, Powell	2:23
7.	"One Way Hotel"	Holder, Lea, Powell	2:39
8.	"Get Down and Get with It"	Bobby Marchan	3:48
9.	"In Like a Shot from My Gun (Live)"	Holder, Lea	3:09
10.	"Coz I Luv You"	Holder, Lea	3:25
11.	"Look Wot You Dun"	Holder, Lea, Powell	2:57
12.	"Take Me Bak 'Ome"	Holder, Lea	3:15
13.	"Wonderin' Y"	Lea, Powell	2:49
14.	"Mama Weer All Crazee Now"	Holder, Lea	3:44
15.	"Gudbuy T'Jane"	Holder, Lea	3:32
16.	"The Whole World's Goin' Crazee"	Holder	3:35
17.	"I Won't Let It 'Appen Again"	Lea	3:15
18.	"Cum On Feel the Noize"	Holder, Lea	4:24
19.	"I'm Mee I'm Now and That's Orl"	Holder, Lea	3:40
20.	"Skweeze Me, Pleeze Me"	Holder, Lea	4:28
21.	"Kill 'Em at the Hot Club Tonite"	Holder, Lea	3:19
22.	"My Friend Stan"	Holder, Lea	2:40
23.	"Merry Xmas Everybody"	Holder, Lea	3:26

=== Disc two ===
All tracks are written by Noddy Holder and Jim Lea except "My Baby Left Me" by Arthur Crudup.

No.	Title	Length
1.	"When the Lights Are Out"	3:04
2.	"We're Really Gonna Raise the Roof"	3:08
3.	"How Can It Be"	3:01
4.	"Everyday"	3:09
5.	"The Bangin' Man"	4:11
6.	"She Did It to Me"	3:18
7.	"Far Far Away"	3:36
8.	"So Far So Good"	3:01
9.	"How Does It Feel"	5:53
10.	"Thanks for the Memory (Wham Bam Thank You Mam)"	4:33
11.	"In for a Penny"	3:35
12.	"Can You Just Imagine"	3:31
13.	"Let's Call It Quits"	3:31
14.	"When the Chips are Down"	4:14
15.	"Nobody's Fool"	4:39
16.	"L.A. Jinx"	3:58
17.	"Gypsy Roadhog"	3:24
18.	"Be"	3:55
19.	"It Ain't Love but It Ain't Bad"	3:10
20.	"Burning in the Heat of Love"	3:36
21.	"My Baby Left Me but That's Alright Mama"	2:24

=== Disc three ===
All tracks are written by Noddy Holder and Jim Lea except "Okey Cokey" by Jimmy Kennedy.

No.	Title	Length
1.	"Give Us a Goal"	2:49
2.	"Rock 'n' Roll Bolero"	4:05
3.	"It's Alright Buy Me"	3:21
4.	"Ginny, Ginny"	3:39
5.	"Sign of the Times"	3:57
6.	"Not Tonight Josephine"	3:02
7.	"Okey Cokey"	3:25
8.	"Don't Waste Your Time (Back Seat Star)"	3:28
9.	"We'll Bring the House Down"	3:32
10.	"Wheels Ain't Coming Down"	3:36
11.	"Night Starvation"	3:05
12.	"When I'm Dancin' I Ain't Fightin'"	3:08
13.	"Knuckle Sandwich Nancy"	3:14
14.	"Lock Up Your Daughters"	3:28
15.	"Rock and Roll Preacher"	5:45
16.	"Till Deaf Do Us Part"	3:29
17.	"Ruby Red"	2:53
18.	"A Night to Remember"	3:55
19.	"(And Now the Waltz) C'est La Vie"	3:50
20.	"My Oh My"	4:10
21.	"Keep Your Hands off My Power Supply"	3:33

=== Disc four ===
All tracks are written by Noddy Holder and Jim Lea except "Let's Dance" by Jim Lee, and "Radio Wall of Sound" and "Universe" by Lea.

No.	Title	Length
1.	"Don't Tame a Hurricane"	2:32
2.	"Ready to Explode"	8:30
3.	"Run Runaway"	5:00
4.	"Two Track Stereo One Track Mind"	2:53
5.	"All Join Hands"	5:30
6.	"Little Sheila"	3:56
7.	"7 Year Bitch"	4:15
8.	"Leave Them Girls Alone"	3:14
9.	"Myzsterious Mizster Jones"	3:35
10.	"Do You Believe in Miracles"	4:09
11.	"Still the Same"	4:12
12.	"Gotta Go Home"	3:18
13.	"That's What Friends Are For"	3:17
14.	"You Boyz Make Big Noize"	3:00
15.	"Ooh La La in L.A."	3:51
16.	"We Won't Give In"	3:37
17.	"Let's Dance '88"	2:40
18.	"Radio Wall of Sound"	3:46
19.	"Universe"	4:15

== Critical reception ==
Professional ratings
Review scores
Source	Rating
AllMusic	3/5 stars
BBC Radio London	favourable
Daily Mirror	favourable
Classic Rock	favourable
Music Week	favourable

Upon release, Dave Thompson of AllMusic commented:

"The problem with Slade is, when they were good they were so very, very good that it becomes very difficult to pay much attention to the rest of their career. Which means, sadly, that anybody buying The Slade Box as any kind of substitute for the earlier albums is in for something of a disappointment. No complaints with the track listing, though. Across 84 tracks, Slade's entire catalog has been cherry-picked for precisely the right songs to illustrate a career of their depth and dynamism. But when the strict chronology means you hit "Merry Xmas Everybody" at the end of disc one; and "In for a Penny" by midway through disc two, that means there's an awful lot more to listen through before the four discs are at an end. And it really is too much, no matter how much you love the band. Of course, a democratic trawl through the band's entire catalog is no less than Slade deserve, and history will thank Union Square for finally giving the later years a fair crack of the whip. The booklet is wonderful, the packaging attractive and the sound quality is superlative."

Gary Crowley of BBC Radio London said: "This splendidly put together 4-CD set is a timely reminder of their might and talent, which went far beyond the numerous foot-stompin', badly-spelt hits they racked up in the singles charts over the years." Gavin Martin of Daily Mirror wrote: "This collection – complete with an excellent essay charting their career – is an essential fan's portrait of a working band in their prime." Peter Makowski of Classic Rock commented: "This four-CD compilation presents a comprehensive history of our dyslexic gurners, from their early skinhead days as an underwhelming rock band to the golden years and a non-stop barrage of stomping hits." Alan Jones from Music Week said: "Appearing hot on the heels of individually upgraded and remastered editions of Slade's albums, this four CD boxed set is a superb alternative, collecting together 84 hits, album cuts and rarities from 1969 to 1991 in a sturdy cardboard longbox, which also includes a 72-page booklet containing an informative essay on the band by Keith Altham, an extensive discography and a multitude of pictures of the band."

== Personnel ==
Slade

- Noddy Holder – lead vocals, guitar
- Dave Hill – lead guitar, backing vocals
- Jim Lea – bass, piano, violin, keyboards, guitar, backing vocals
- Don Powell – drums

The Slade Box personnel

- Slade, Colin Newman – project management
- Mark Brennan – project consultant
- Tim Turan – remastering
- Keith Altham – liner notes
- Andrew Birkin, Barry Plummer, Dezo Hoffmann, Gered Mankowitz – photography
