= Cum On Feel the Hitz: The Best of Slade =

Compilation album by Slade
- Released: 25 September 2020
- Genre: Hard rock
- Length: 157:00
- Label: BMG

Slade chronology
When Slade Rocked the World (2015)	Cum On Feel the Hitz: The Best of Slade (2020)

Cum On Feel the Hitz: The Best of Slade is a compilation album by the British rock band Slade, released on 25 September 2020 through BMG Rights Management. It includes 43 tracks across two discs. It reached the top 10 of the UK Albums Chart and was certified silver by the British Phonographic Industry (BPI) in 2023.

== Critical reception ==
Professional ratings
Review scores
Source	Rating
American Songwriter	4/5 stars

Hal Horowitz of American Songwriter wrote that "this exhaustive, some might say exhausting, 43 track compilation presents the quartet in all their 'Radio Wall of Sound' glory, to quote one of their lesser known pop rocking gems". Horowitz also felt that Slade's music is "heavy on stomping beats and impossibly catchy choruses made for stadium-sized, chanting" and their "music may seem simplistic and somewhat repetitious, but writing anthemic choruses meant to be shouted by well-oiled fans cranked up at ear-splitting volume is a talent few can pull off, let alone as effectively as this".

== Track listing ==
All tracks are written by Noddy Holder and Jim Lea except "Look Wot You Dun" by Holder, Lea and Don Powell, "Get Down and Get with It" by Bobby Marchan, and "Radio Wall of Sound" by Lea.

Disc 1 track listing
No.	Title	Length
1.	"Cum On Feel the Noize"	4:23
2.	"Skweeze Me, Pleeze Me"	4:27
3.	"Mama Weer All Crazee Now"	3:42
4.	"Coz I Luv You"	3:23
5.	"Take Me Bak 'Ome"	3:13
6.	"Gudbuy T'Jane"	3:31
7.	"My Friend Stan"	2:39
8.	"Far Far Away"	3:34
9.	"My Oh My"	4:09
10.	"Everyday"	3:09
11.	"The Bangin' Man"	4:10
12.	"Look Wot You Dun"	2:56
13.	"Thanks for the Memory"	4:32
14.	"Run Runaway"	3:42
15.	"We'll Bring the House Down"	3:31
16.	"In for a Penny"	3:33
17.	"Let's Call It Quits"	3:30
18.	"How Does It Feel"	5:52
19.	"All Join Hands"	4:12
20.	"Get Down and Get with It"	3:48
21.	"Radio Wall of Sound"	3:45

All tracks are written by Holder and Lea except "My Baby Left Me: That's Alright" by Arthur Crudup, "The Shape of Things to Come" by Barry Mann and Cynthia Weil, and "Know Who You Are" by Lea, Holder, Powell and Dave Hill.

Disc 2 track listing
No.	Title	Length
1.	"Lock Up Your Daughters"	3:29
2.	"My Baby Left Me: That's Alright"	2:24
3.	"Gypsy Roadhog"	3:24
4.	"(And Now the Waltz) C'est La Vie"	3:44
5.	"Myzsterious Mizster Jones"	3:35
6.	"Ruby Red"	2:54
7.	"Do You Believe in Miracles"	4:10
8.	"Wheels Ain't Coming Down"	3:36
9.	"7 Year Bitch"	4:16
10.	"Still the Same"	4:12
11.	"The Shape of Things to Come"	2:17
12.	"Know Who You Are"	2:54
13.	"Nobody's Fool"	4:40
14.	"Burning in the Heat of Love"	3:36
15.	"Give Us a Goal"	2:49
16.	"Ginny, Ginny"	3:39
17.	"Sign of the Times"	3:58
18.	"Knuckle Sandwich Nancy"	3:13
19.	"Ooh La La in L.A."	3:52
20.	"That's What Friends Are For"	3:17
21.	"We Won't Give In"	3:38
22.	"Merry Xmas Everybody"	3:43

== Personnel ==
Slade

- Noddy Holder – lead vocals, rhythm guitar
- Dave Hill – lead guitar, backing vocals
- Jim Lea – bass, guitar, piano, violin, keyboards, backing vocals, lead vocals on ‘’Radio Wall of Sound’’
- Don Powell – drums

Production

- Chas Chandler – production (disc 1: tracks 1–8, 10–13, 16–18, 20, disc 2: tracks 2, 3, 11–15, 22)
- John Punter – production (disc 1: tracks 9, 14, 19, disc 2: tracks 5, 7, 9, 10, 19)
- Slade – production (disc 1: track 15, disc 2: tracks 1, 4, 6, 8, 16–18)
- Jim Lea – production (disc 1: track 21, disc 2: track 21)
- Roy Thomas Baker – production (disc 2: track 20)

Other

- Gered Mankowitz – photography
- Neel Panchal – art direction
- Florence de la Fournière – design

== Charts ==
Chart performance for Cum On Feel the Hitz: The Best of Slade
Chart (2020)	Peak position
Austrian Albums (Ö3 Austria)	54
Belgian Albums (Ultratop Flanders)	105
German Albums (Offizielle Top 100)	35
Scottish Albums (OCC)	2
Swiss Albums (Schweizer Hitparade)	73
UK Albums (OCC)	8
UK Independent Albums (OCC)	2
UK Rock & Metal Albums (OCC)	3

== Certifications ==
Certifications for Cum On Feel the Hitz: The Best of Slade
Region	Certification	Certified units/sales
United Kingdom (BPI)	Silver	60,000^{‡}
^{‡} Sales+streaming figures based on certification alone.
