= The Slade Collection Vol. 2, 79–87 =

Compilation album by Slade
- Released: December 1993
- Genre: Rock
- Length: 62:53
- Label: RCA; BMG; Polydor

Slade chronology
Wall of Hits (1991)	The Slade Collection Vol. 2, 79–87 (1993)	The Genesis of Slade (1996)

Professional ratings
Review scores
Source	Rating
The Encyclopedia of Popular Music	3/5 stars

The Slade Collection Vol. 2, 79–87 is a compilation album by the British rock band Slade, released in 1993 by RCA Records/BMG (Europe) and Polydor Records (UK). A sequel to the 1991 compilation The Slade Collection 81–87, it contains seventeen tracks spanning the band's career from 1979 to 1987. In 2007, Salvo released a remastered version of the compilation, along with The Slade Collection 81–87, as The Collection 79–87.

== Track listing ==
All tracks are written by Noddy Holder and Jim Lea except "I'm a Rocker" by Chuck Berry.

No.	Title	Length
1.	"Sing Shout (Knock Yourself Out)"	3:10
2.	"The Roaring Silence"	2:48
3.	"That Was No Lady, That Was My Wife"	2:31
4.	"We Won't Give In"	3:37
5.	"Razzle Dazzle Man"	4:36
6.	"Rock and Roll Preacher"	5:34
7.	"I'll Be There"	4:35
8.	"I'm a Rocker"	2:41
9.	"Ruby Red"	2:49
10.	"Slam the Hammer Down"	3:23
11.	"Ooh La La in L.A."	3:52
12.	"Harmony"	3:47
13.	"Hey Ho Wish You Well"	5:08
14.	"Hold on to Your Hats"	2:33
15.	"Cheap 'n' Nasty Luv"	3:28
16.	"Little Sheila"	3:58
17.	"When I'm Dancin' I Ain't Fightin' (Live)"	3:47

== Personnel ==
Slade

- Noddy Holder – lead vocals, rhythm guitar
- Dave Hill – lead guitar, backing vocals
- Jim Lea – bass, piano, keyboards, guitar, backing vocals
- Don Powell – drums

Production

- Jim Lea – tracks 1–2, 4–5, 10, 12, 15
- Slade – tracks 3, 6, 8–9, 14, 17
- John Punter – tracks 7, 11, 13, 16
