= The Slade Collection 81–87 =

Compilation album by Slade
- Released: March 1991
- Genre: Rock
- Length: 63:03
- Label: RCA

Slade chronology
You Boyz Make Big Noize (1987)	The Slade Collection 81–87 (1991)	Wall of Hits (1991)

The Slade Collection 81–87 is a compilation album by the British rock band Slade, released by RCA Records in March 1991. It contains seventeen tracks spanning the band's years with the RCA label from 1981 to 1987, including three live tracks from Slade on Stage. A follow-up album, The Slade Collection Vol. 2, 79–87, was released in 1993.

The album was re-issued in Europe in 1993 by Castle Communications. In 1996, BMG/RCA re-issued it in Europe, with Castle Communications handling the UK release. Another re-issue followed in 1999 from Polydor. In 2007, Salvo released a remastered version of the compilation, along with The Slade Collection Vol. 2, 79–87, as The Collection 79–87.

== Critical reception ==
Professional ratings
Review scores
Source	Rating
AllMusic	3/5 stars
The Encyclopedia of Popular Music	3/5 stars
Hi-Fi News & Record Review	favourable

Stephen Thomas Erlewine of AllMusic wrote: "For casual fans wishing to supplement the storming, sleazy fun of Feel the Noize, The Slade Collection: '81–'87 contains all of the best latter-day tracks the group recorded, including "My Oh My" and "Run Run Away." Even in this condensed state, the material on '81–'87 isn't as compelling as it was between 1970 and 1975, but this compilation is certainly the best way to sample an inconsistent era." Hi-Fi News & Record Review commented: "OK, there are two or three numbers so corny that you'll reach for the sick bag, but other than that, this is fine pop."

== Track listing ==
All tracks are written by Noddy Holder and Jim Lea except "Love Is Like a Rock" by Mark Avsec, Albritton McClain, Donnie Iris, Marty Lee Hoenes and Kevin Valentine.

No.	Title	Length
1.	"Run Runaway"	3:46
2.	"Everyday (Live)"	3:16
3.	"We'll Bring the House Down"	3:36
4.	"Ruby Red"	2:55
5.	"(And Now the Waltz) C'est La Vie"	3:26
6.	"Do You Believe in Miracles"	4:13
7.	"Still the Same"	4:15
8.	"My Oh My"	4:13
9.	"All Join Hands"	4:16
10.	"Wheels Ain't Coming Down"	3:38
11.	"7 Year Bitch"	4:20
12.	"Myzsterious Mizster Jones"	3:38
13.	"Lock Up Your Daughters"	3:30
14.	"Me and the Boys"	2:42
15.	"Gudbye T'Jane (Live)"	4:41
16.	"Mama Weer All Crazee Now (Live)"	3:00
17.	"Love Is Like a Rock"	3:38

== Personnel ==
Slade

- Noddy Holder – lead vocals, rhythm guitar
- Dave Hill – lead guitar, backing vocals
- Jim Lea – bass, piano, violin, keyboard, guitar, backing vocals
- Don Powell – drums

Production

- John Punter – tracks 1, 6–9, 11–12
- Slade – tracks 2–4, 10, 13, 15–16
- Jim Lea – tracks 5, 14
- Roy Thomas Baker – track 17

Other

- Paul Robinson – compiler
- Wildlife – design
