= When Slade Rocked the World =

When Slade Rocked the World 1971–1975

Box set by Slade
- Released: 13 November 2015
- Genre: Rock
- Label: Salvo
- Producer: Chas Chandler

Slade chronology
Merry Xmas Everybody: Party Hits (2009)	When Slade Rocked the World 1971–1975 (2015)	Cum On Feel the Hitz: The Best of Slade (2020)

When Slade Rocked the World 1971–1975 is a compilation box set by the British rock band Slade, released by Salvo in November 2015. The box set, housed in a 12-inch box, covers the band's commercial heyday from 1971 to 1975, with a mix of reproduced vinyl LPs, 7" vinyl singles, a two-disc CD, a scrapbook-style book and a reproduced edition of the book The Slade Story, written by George Tremlett.

When Slade Rocked the World was first announced in July 2015 and was made available for pre-order on PledgeMusic. A limited-edition version of the box set was made exclusively available through the platform, which included an exclusive set of reproduced Slade in Flame film lobby cards. Speaking of the project, BMG's Steve Bunyan later commented to Music Managers Forum: "We wanted to put something together that the band, fans and media would all think was a worthy summary of Slade at the peak of their powers. I think we achieved it."

In September 2016, the box set won "Special Catalogue Release of the Year" at that year's AIM Awards. It was also nominated for the Classic Rock Awards "Reissue of the Year".

== Contents ==
- Reproduced and remastered vinyl LPs: Slade Alive! (1972), Slayed? (1972), Old New Borrowed and Blue (1974) and Slade in Flame (1974). All four LPs are pressed on 180gm coloured vinyl.
- Double-sided 7-inch singles with picture sleeves (covering non-album singles of the period): "Coz I Luv You"/"Look Wot You Dun", "Take Me Bak 'Ome"/"Cum on Feel the Noize", "Skweeze Me, Pleeze Me"/"Merry Xmas Everybody", and "The Bangin' Man"/"Thanks for the Memory".
- Single-sided 7-inch flexi-disc: Slade Talk to "19" Readers.
- Two-disc CD featuring Slade Alive!, Slayed?, Old New Borrowed and Blue and Slade in Flame.
- Scrapbook-style hardback book containing articles and memorabilia, along with an introduction by Mark Ellen.
- Reproduced copy of the 1975 book The Slade Story, written by George Tremlett.
- Eight reproduced Slade in Flame film lobby cards (with the limited Deluxe Edition of the box set only).

== Critical reception ==
Professional ratings
Review scores
Source	Rating
The Arts Desk	favourable
Classic Rock	favourable
Daily Mirror	4/5 stars
The Guardian	4/5 stars
Mojo	4/5 stars
Record Collector	4/5 stars
The Sunday Times	favourable
Uncut	8/10 stars
Vive Le Rock	9/10 stars

Upon release, Vive Le Rock described the set as the "ultimate box set", adding that it "deserves a place in every self-respecting rock 'n' roll and glam rock-loving home." Daily Mirror praised the compilation as a "sumptuous vinyl box set", describing it as "major[ing] in roof-raising pop glories" and being the "perfect Yuletide gift for the discerning rock 'n' roller". The Sunday Times noted the set stood out for its "spectacular packaging, humour and reproduced curios". David Cavanagh of Uncut wrote: "As we hear time and again on When Slade Rocked the World, they weren't just churning out chart fodder to fill the nostalgic dancefloors of future school discos. They were better musicians than that for a start; a tight, syncopated four-piece, they could swing viciously and attack with force."

Daryl Easlea of Record Collector described the set as a "superbly packaged collection" and a "very fitting tribute". He concluded: "This collection emphasises how unique they really were, not to mention their instinctive way with a melody. To this young fan, their tunes were accessible in a way that, say, Bowie's was not."Alexis Petridis of The Guardian commented: "Its deathlessness ["Merry Xmas Everybody"] has fixed Slade forever in the public imagination as beloved purveyors of glittery, raucous pop anthems. They were more complex and expansive than that, as When Slade Rocked the World proves..." Kieron Tyler of The Arts Desk described the box set as "lavish", but felt it was "unlikely to alter perceptions". He said: "Being confronted with this much Slade in one go is daunting. The familiar hit singles whizz by but the context of their albums brings a new life and a surprising freshness. When Slade Rocked the World is not strictly essential due to the availability of much of its content in its original form. But it is well-conceived and will thrill any fan of the band."

== Personnel ==
Slade

- Noddy Holder — lead vocals, rhythm guitar
- Dave Hill — lead guitar, backing vocals
- Jim Lea — bass, piano, violin, backing vocals
- Don Powell — drums, backing vocals
