= Merry Xmas Everybody: Party Hits =

Compilation album by Slade
- Released: 23 November 2009
- Genre: Hard rock
- Label: Universal Music TV
- Producer: Chas Chandler, John Punter, Jim Lea, Slade

Slade chronology
Live at the BBC (2009)	Merry Xmas Everybody: Party Hits (2009)	When Slade Rocked the World (2015)

Merry Xmas Everybody: Party Hits is a compilation album by the British rock band Slade. Aimed at the Christmas market, the album was released on 23 November 2009 and reached No. 151 in the UK.

== Track listing ==
No.	Title	Writer(s)	Length
1.	"Merry Xmas Everybody"	Noddy Holder, Jim Lea	3:25
2.	"Santa Claus Is Coming to Town"	John Frederick Coots, Haven Gillespie	2:39
3.	"Mama Weer All Crazee Now"	Holder, Lea	3:44
4.	"Let The Good Times Roll/Feel So Fine"	Leonard Lee	3:46
5.	"Coz I Luv You"	Holder, Lea	3:24
6.	"Gudbuy T'Jane"	Holder, Lea	3:31
7.	"We're Really Gonna to Raise the Roof"	Holder, Lea	3:09
8.	"Cum On Feel the Noize"	Holder, Lea	4:30
9.	"My Baby Left Me But That's Alright Mama"	Arthur Crudup	2:24
10.	"Skweeze Me Pleeze Me"	Holder, Lea	4:28
11.	"Let's Have a Party"	Cliff Friend, Joe Haynes, Phil Baxter	1:47
12.	"Hey Ho Wish You Well"	Holder, Lea	5:17
13.	"Let's Dance"	Jim Lee	2:36
14.	"I'm a Rocker"	Chuck Berry	2:41
15.	"My Oh My (Swing Version)"	Holder, Lea	3:04
16.	"Standin' On the Corner"	Holder, Lea	4:54
17.	"Do You Believe in Miracles"	Holder, Lea	4:11
18.	"All Join Hands"	Holder, Lea	4:16
19.	"Okey Cokey"	Jimmy Kennedy	3:25
20.	"Here's to the New Year"	Holder, Lea	3:10

== Chart performance ==
Chart (2009)	Peak position
UK Albums Chart	151

== Personnel ==
- Noddy Holder - lead vocals, rhythm guitar
- Dave Hill - lead guitar, backing vocals
- Jim Lea - bass, piano, violin, keyboards, backing vocals
- Don Powell - drums
