= You Boyz Make Big Noize =

Studio album by Slade
- Released: 27 April 1987
- Recorded: Portland Studios, Redan Studios and Music Works
- Genre: Hard rock
- Length: 41:02
- Labels: RCA; CBS Associated
- Producers: Jim Lea; John Punter; Roy Thomas Baker

Slade chronology
Crackers: The Christmas Party Album (1985)	You Boyz Make Big Noize (1987)	The Slade Collection 81–87 (1991)

Singles from You Boyz Make Big Noize
- 1. "Still the Same" Released: 20 February 1987; 2. "That's What Friends Are For" Released: 20 April 1987; 3. "Ooh La La in L.A." Released: 10 July 1987; 4. "We Won't Give In" Released: 27 November 1987

You Boyz Make Big Noize is the fourteenth and final studio album by the British rock group Slade. It was released on 27 April 1987 and reached number 98 in the UK Albums Chart. The album was largely produced by bassist Jim Lea, with two tracks produced by John Punter and another two by Roy Thomas Baker. It was the last studio album by the original lineup, prior to their split in 1992.

The US version of the album, which was released on the CBS label on 3 August 1987, replaced "Fools Go Crazy" with the title track "You Boyz Make Big Noize", which was recorded after the UK and European release of the album.

== Background ==
Following Slade's decision to stop touring in 1984, the band continued to record new material. The 1985 album Rogues Gallery had been a hit across Europe but saw only limited success in the UK and US. When the band set out to record their next album in 1986, they hoped to record a hit album that would put Slade back into the public eye. Initially the band hired producer Roy Thomas Baker to produce the album, but the band felt his working methods were too lengthy and expensive. In the end, Baker completed two tracks, John Punter produced another two and Jim Lea finished the rest.

The lead single, "Still The Same" was released in February 1987 and stalled at No. 73. A lack of airplay on Radio One was seen as an important factor for the chart position as the single had been B-Listed and not A-Listed on the radio's playlist. The second single, "That's What Friends Are For" was released a week before the album in April and reached No. 95. The poor chartings saw RCA unwilling to invest large amounts of money into promoting the album, which reached No. 98 in the UK. In July, a non-album single of the same name, "You Boyz Make Big Noize" was released by the band under the Cheapskate label. It was distributed by RCA and reached No. 94. Around the same time, "Ooh La La in L.A." was released from the album in America by CBS and Germany by RCA. The lack of commercial success resulted in the end of the band's contract with RCA. Despite this, the album track "We Won't Give In" was later released on the Cheapskate label as the album's fourth and final single, but only reached No. 121 in the UK.

In a mid-1986 interview, lead vocalist Noddy Holder spoke of the upcoming album: "We've finally got it finished and feel we have some of the best songs we've ever written." Speaking in a late 1987 fan club interview, Lea commented of his production work on the album: "When I listened to You Boyz Make Big Noize, which is the last thing I did, I thought "this really stands up, I can put this on and be proud of it"."

Due to Holder's personal reasons, the idea of touring to promote the album was ruled out. Speaking in a 1987 fan club interview, guitarist Dave Hill said: "We could announce a tour now, but caution tells us that we'd do better to announce one on the back of a hit. We haven't called it a day on the touring and if luck would have it, we could be touring after this LP." Responding to rumours of the band splitting up, Hill replied: "Fans might be feeling a little left out and a bit disappointed, but they've got to understand that 21 years now is a long time to stay together as a group. We are a little older and we are still trying. I think that deep-seatedly within the group, every one of us would play live, but what we are searching for is a way to take us to another stage of success."

Without a contract with a major label, Slade would not record another album again. In 1991, the band recorded two new singles for Polydor, "Radio Wall of Sound" and "Universe", but would split up shortly after in 1992. Drummer Don Powell later recalled of the album: "It wasn't us, there was no identity on that album. It would have been nice for the original band to have gone out with a better album, like the Slade in Flame album or Slayed?. It was like a certain magic was missing. The closeness that we'd had wasn't there."

== Recording ==
You Boyz Make Big Noize was recorded at Wessex Studios, Portland Studios, Redan Studios and Music Works. The album's title was chosen after Betty, a Wessex Studios tea-lady, commented to Slade "you boys make big noise" during a recording session. For the album, Holder and Lea demoed around eighteen tracks, while Hill put forward four of his own demos.

In an early 1987 fan club interview, Powell spoke of the album's completion: "We finished the album yesterday, actually. We spent yesterday piecing it together and sorting out the running order. We know exactly which tracks will be on the album – all of which is new material. The album has taken us a long time to record, especially the tracks that John Punter and Roy produced. We spent the first two days with Roy just trying to get the drum sound as he wanted it. He had forty odd mikes over my kit, and it sounded like thunder in the studios. The album is more of a sing-a-long one, as opposed to a heavy metal album."

In a late 1986 fan club interview, Lea spoke of the band's work with Roy Thomas Baker: "I was out with Roy one night, and he got serious for one moment, and said "The only reason I'm here with you lot is because right now in America all the young bands, certainly in Los Angeles, are searching for the formula that Slade created – commercial songs with that edge, and that sound where it all comes out as one". Roy Thomas Baker was the one who put the word 'producer' on the modern map of production – it was a great compliment from him."

== Promotion ==
The album received little promotion from the label, largely due to the disappointing sales of "Still the Same". No music videos were filmed to promote the singles. In a 1987 fan club interview, Hill discussed the song's failure:

""Still the same" is basically being regarded as a flop in terms of what was expected of it. I think the record company were mostly disappointed as it was them rather than the group who chose it. We brought this record out, not in the usual Christmas period, which on the face of it seemed to me to be a feasible idea as an attempt to get away from the 'Slade only exist at Christmas time' situation. On listening to opinion though, it seems to have been regarded as another "My Oh My"-type song, which perhaps should have come out at Christmas. When "My Oh My" was released, it was just as slow to take off, but as soon as we got the radio play, it rocketed. "Still the Same" did virtually the same chart-wise in its first few weeks, but at the point where "My Oh My" picked up radio play, "Still the Same" was dropped completely."

== Critical reception ==
Professional ratings
Review scores
Source	Rating
AllMusic	3/5 stars
Kerrang!	3/5 stars
Record-Journal	B
Reno Gazette-Journal	3.5/5 stars

Upon its release, John Gibson of the Edinburgh Evening News commented how the band were "hangin' on in there, determined to stay with chart trends" and added, "So determined here that they could pass for metallists. Call it the mature side of Slade." Paul Taylor of the Manchester Evening News stated that Slade are "still in a class of their own for the blindingly obvious sway-along rock melody". He continued, "In the cold light of day, it's lumbering and cliché-ridden, but with the right company and the odd beverage, who can say they have not bopped joyfully to Noddy Holder's gravelly tones? This album provides more of the same – more polished in production than of old, but still taken from the first pages of the ABC of yob rock." The Fife Free Press called the album "typical Slade", "full of sing-a-long anthems and bouncy scarf wavers guaranteed to provide the perfect panacea for whatever ails you". He added, "In my book, Noddy and the lads can go on forever if they continue to dispense spirit-lifting albums of this ilk." John W. Milne of the Banffshire Journal considered it to be "one of their best" albums.

Mark Kearns of the Harrow Leader remarked that Slade "still have the knack of knocking out catchy, if vacuous, tunes" and felt that "there's no real quality here, but a certain dogged persistence that pays dividends". Jon Hotten of Kerrang! was mixed in his review, nothing that while "all the songs bear the unmistakable Slade stamp, 12 potential singles, 12 stomp-along, shout-it-out choruses", there was "nothing remotely new" within the "12 terrace anthems" and even Holder, who "as ever sings his heart out", "sounds a little jaded after all this time". He concluded, "At last Slade have carved a comfortable little niche for themselves under the heading 'British Institution', and their necks are getting a bit old and scraggy for sticking out now. If you like Slade, you'll like this, if you don't, then I don't think this is the album to convert you."

In the US, reviews were generally positive. Billboard recommended the album and commented that the "long-lived glam rockers cleave to their formula of raucous, guitar-based rock with shout-along choruses". Cash Box noted the album "pulls no punches with Noddy Holder belting out the melodic stompers". Jim Zebora of Record-Journal considered it to "prove that these rocking old-timers still have what it takes in the world of pop metal" and continued, "Perhaps the thing that Slade does best and what makes their playing so entertaining is the mixture of rocking sincerity and good humor about what it all means. 'Sing Shout (Knock Yourself Out)' describes this philosophy in song, and boy does it make you want to move. If this were a just world, Slade would still be making hit records. That they're not just doesn't seem to be their fault." The Press of Atlantic City wrote, "Today, Slade continue to play it heavy but their records are far more positive than most of the sonically similar newer acts. Yes, there is a sense of joy in their sound. Their British football cheer choruses remain, as does the blurry guitar mix."

Eric McClary of the Reno Gazette-Journal described the album as "basher rock all in the spirit of fun" and "good-time music for rugby players and drinking buddies", with "simple unison choruses", "sentimental lyrics" and "lots of optimism". He concluded, "Slade is not deaf to new rock sounds, but the lads know what's kept them going all these years: teary-eyed pub anthems and carousing party tunes. See if you can resist them – I can't." David Emerson of The Boston Globe remarked that Slade's "style of bombastic, teen anthems has changed little", with "songs of defiance, camaraderie, and rock as savior still hold[ing] court in their much copied high camp fashion". He added, "While their songs generally lack the speed of some of their descendants (AC/DC, Mötley Crüe etc...), they show here that they can still make big noize with the best of them. For those of you so inclined, take out your air guitar and turn up the volume." Tom Harrison of the Canadian newspaper The Province noted, "The Troggs of the '80s are as unrepentantly loud as the LP's title proclaims. This is bubblegum heavy metal worthy of the Archies and I mean that as a compliment. As one song suggests, 'Sing Shout (Knock Yourself Out)'." Dale Winnitowy of The Surrey Leader praised it as "glorious, trashy pop-rock tailor-made for excessive volume", with Slade "still best at dynamite teen anthem sing-a-longs like the title song, 'Me and the Boys', 'Sing Shout (Knock Yourself Out)', and 'It's Hard Having Fun Nowadays'".

In a retrospective review, Doug Stone of AllMusic praised Slade for "constantly deliver[ing] the goods", despite being "nuked by the mainstream, metalheads, critics, and America", and noted that every track "stomps out a variation on the Slade theme of 'Sing Shout (Knock Yourself Out)'". He added, "Face facts, AC/DC stole Slade's shtick all those years ago and now can't write its way out of a six pack, while these crazee boyz are still having fun slinging crisp chops and heavy hooks. Kudos. That's what Slade is for."

== Track listing ==
All tracks are written by Noddy Holder and Jim Lea, except "Love Is Like a Rock" by Mark Avsec, Albritton McClain, Donnie Iris, Marty Lee Hoenes and Kevin Valentine, and "Let's Dance" by Jim Lee.

No.	Title	Length
1.	"Love Is Like a Rock"	3:40
2.	"That's What Friends Are For"	3:16
3.	"Still the Same"	4:13
4.	"Fools Go Crazy"	3:16
5.	"She's Heavy"	2:35
6.	"We Won't Give In"	3:37
7.	"Won't You Rock with Me"	3:47
8.	"Ooh La La in L.A."	3:52
9.	"Me and the Boys"	2:48
10.	"Sing Shout (Knock Yourself Out)"	3:10
11.	"The Roaring Silence"	2:48
12.	"It's Hard Having Fun Nowadays"	3:48

2007 Salvo remaster bonus tracks
No.	Title	Length
13.	"Still the Same" (12" version)	5:35
14.	"Gotta Go Home" (B-side of "Still the Same")	3:20
15.	"Don't Talk to Me About Love" (B-side of "Still the Same")	2:28
16.	"Wild Wild Party" (B-side of "That's What Friends Are For")	2:55
17.	"You Boyz Make Big Noize" (1987 non-album single)	3:01
18.	"You Boyz Make Big Noize" (Noize remix)	5:31
19.	"You Boyz Make Big Noize" (instrumental version; B-side of "You Boyz Make Big Noize")	3:01
20.	"You Boyz Make Big Noize" (USA mix; B-side of "You Boyz Make Big Noize" 12")	3:00
21.	"Let's Dance" ('88 remix; 1988 non-album single)	2:40

== Personnel ==
Slade

- Noddy Holder – lead vocals, rhythm guitar
- Dave Hill – lead guitar, backing vocals
- Jim Lea – bass guitar, keyboards, guitars, backing vocals
- Don Powell – drums, percussion

Production

- Jim Lea – production (tracks 4–7, 9–12), arrangement (all tracks)
- John Punter – production (tracks 3, 8)
- Roy Thomas Baker – production (tracks 1, 2)
- Gerrard Johnson – keyboard programming
- Pete Hammond – keyboard programming
- Dave Garland – engineering
- Jerry Napier – engineering
- Mark Dearney – engineering
- Matt Butler – engineering
- Trevor Hallesey – engineering

== Charts ==
Chart performance for You Boyz Make Big Noize
Chart (1987)	Peak position
Norwegian Albums (VG-lista)	12
UK Albums (Official Charts)	98
UK Heavy Metal Albums (Spotlight Research)	21
