= Play It Loud =

Studio album by Slade
- Released: November 1970
- Genre: Hard rock
- Length: 34:05
- Labels: Polydor (UK), Cotillion (US)
- Producer: Chas Chandler

Slade chronology
Beginnings (1969)	Play It Loud (1970)	Coz I Luv You (1972)

Singles from Play it Loud
- 1. "Shape of Things to Come" Released: March 1970; 2. "Know Who You Are" Released: September 1970

Play It Loud is the second studio album by the British rock group Slade. It was released by Polydor in November 1970 but did not enter the charts. The album, produced by Chas Chandler, was the first to be released under the Slade name, as the band's 1969 debut Beginnings was released under the name Ambrose Slade.

== Background ==
Following the lack of commercial success of their debut Beginnings, the band and their new manager Chas Chandler began considering their next career move. Having not been pleased with the debut album, Chandler thought the band would benefit from writing their own material and a change of image. He decided that the band should project a skinhead image in the effort to generate interest in the band. Both guitarist Dave Hill and bassist Jim Lea were mortified by the revised image, but the band agreed to try the idea and adopted Dr. Martens boots, braces, cropped hair and aggressive "bovver boy" posturing.

Coinciding with the new image, Ambrose Slade changed their name to "The Slade", which was used on their single "Wild Winds Are Blowing", released in October 1969. The single was another commercial failure. In March 1970, the band's next single, "Shape of Things to Come", was released but also failed to chart. As a result, Chandler soon moved Slade from Fontana to Polydor Records, believing a higher-profile label would boost sales. The band continued recording songs for their next album, with Chandler assuming responsibility for the group's production. For the album, much of the material was written by the band.

In September 1970, "Know Who You Are" was released as the band's debut single on Polydor. However, it too was a commercial failure, as was its parent album, Play It Loud, when it was released in November. Afterwards, the band decided to drop their skinhead image and would achieve commercial success with their mid-1971 single "Get Down and Get with It". Speaking to Classic Rock in 2005, lead vocalist Noddy Holder recalled: "We got a lot of flak for being a skinhead band, so gradually we changed. We replaced Doc Martens with platform boots. We became more colourful and then it all went berserk – Dave the Superyob with his spacesuits and all the rest. It was a great laugh."

Later in 1973, the album would achieve commercial success in Canada after it was released there by Polydor, reaching No. 40. In a 1975 interview, Holder said: "Actually, Play It Loud did nothing at first. When it came out, we hadn't had any hit records, or any success, and it sold a few. It sold about ten thousand copies, something like that. But over the years, over the last four years since we've been having hits, it's still been selling slowly, slowly, and about two weeks ago, it reached a silver album."

== Promotion ==
The band appeared on the UK show Disco 2 to promote the album. They made three appearances during 1970, performing "Shape of Things to Come", "Know Who You Are" and "Sweet Box". All three performances have never surfaced since broadcasting.

== Track listing ==
Side one
No.	Title	Writer(s)	Length
1.	"Raven"	Jim Lea, Noddy Holder, Don Powell	2:37
2.	"See Us Here"	Lea, Holder, Powell	3:12
3.	"Dapple Rose"	Lea, Powell	3:31
4.	"Could I"	Jimmy Griffin, Robb Royer	2:45
5.	"One Way Hotel"	Lea, Holder, Powell	2:40
6.	"The Shape of Things to Come"	Barry Mann, Cynthia Weil	2:18

Side two
No.	Title	Writer(s)	Length
7.	"Know Who You Are"	Lea, Holder, Powell, Hill	2:53
8.	"I Remember"	Lea, Powell	2:55
9.	"Pouk Hill"	Lea, Holder, Powell	2:23
10.	"Angelina"	Neil Innes	2:49
11.	"Dirty Joker"	Lea, Powell	3:26
12.	"Sweet Box"	Lea, Powell	3:24

Japanese '24 Bit remaster 2006' bonus tracks
No.	Title	Writer(s)	Length
13.	"Get Down And Get With It" (non-album single)	Bobby Marchan	3:50
14.	"Coz I Luv You" (non-album single)	Holder, Lea	3:26
15.	"Look Wot You Dun" (non-album single)	Holder, Lea, Powell	2:58

== Song information ==
"Dapple Rose" features lyrics from Powell about an elderly horse. Recalling the inspiration behind the song, Powell recalled in 2009: "I've always had a fondness for horses and where I lived with my parents there were some fields over the back and there were always gypsies camping there. They used to have these horses and donkeys and they always looked dead to me. They were not looked after which was sad." "One Way Hotel" originally appeared as the B-Side to "Wild Winds are Blowing", but that version had more of a jazz influence in the guitar parts. This was altered for the version that appeared on Play It Loud. "Know Who You Are" was originally an instrumental titled "Genesis", which appeared on Beginnings. "I Remember" features lyrics by Powell about a man who loses his memory. In 1973, Powell would suffer memory issues after being involved in a major car accident. He said in a 2006 interview: "That's strange, isn't it! I wrote the lyrics! That's spooky! I don't remember what the inspiration was at the time when I wrote the lyrics to that one, but that is very weird!"

"Pouk Hill" is named after the landmark of the same name, near Holder's then home on the Beechdale estate. The cover shot of Beginnings' was taken here, in the snow. The occasion later inspired the song.

== Critical reception ==
Professional ratings
Review scores
Source	Rating
AllMusic	3/5 stars
New Musical Express	favourable
Q	2/5 stars

Upon release, New Musical Express summarised the album as "aggressive", adding "that's what the music and vocalising of Slade seems to be, though they vary the volume with great skill, at times quiet, then turning it up and shouting at the listener. The lead vocalist is inclined to shout too much, but then, maybe that is the appeal of the group." In 1991, Q commented that the album, following Beginnings, presented a sound with a "tighter groove". The magazine felt this was "best illustrated" by "The Shape of Things to Come". They concluded: "The track still sounds exciting and belligerent but the rest lacks real fire."

AllMusic felt the album, along with Beginnings, was "more serious" than their future material. They concluded: "On the whole, a good record apart from what they became famous for." In a review of the 2006 Salvo release of Beginnings and Play It Loud combined, AllMusic also described them as "two solidly excellent" and "underrated" albums. The review added that both albums represented the band "as it struggled to come to grips with its own talent."

== Personnel ==
Slade

- Noddy Holder - lead vocals, rhythm guitar
- Dave Hill - lead guitar, backing vocals
- Jim Lea - bass, violin, piano, backing vocals
- Don Powell - drums

Additional personnel

- Chas Chandler - producer
- George Chkiantz - engineer
- Anton Mathews - mixing engineer
- Gered Mankowitz - photography
- Hamish and Gustav - sleeve design

== Charts ==
Chart (1973)	Peak position
Canada Top Albums/CDs (RPM)	40
