= Wild Winds Are Blowing =

Single by The Slade
- B-side: "One Way Hotel"
- Released: 4 October 1969
- Genre: Rock
- Length: 2:43
- Label: Fontana
- Songwriters: Bob Saker, Jack Winsley
- Producer: Chas Chandler

The Slade singles chronology
"Genesis" (1969)	"Wild Winds Are Blowing" (1969)	"The Shape of Things to Come" (1970)

"Wild Winds Are Blowing" is a song by the British rock band Slade, released in 1969 as a non-album single under the name "The Slade". The song was written by Bob Saker and Jack Winsley, and produced by Chas Chandler. It failed to make an appearance in the UK charts.

== Background ==
Following the lack of commercial success of their 1969 debut Beginnings, Ambrose Slade, with their new manager Chas Chandler, began considering their next career move. Having not been pleased with the debut album, Chandler thought the band would benefit from writing their own material and a change of image. He decided that the band should project a skinhead image in the effort to generate interest in the band. Both guitarist Dave Hill and bassist Jim Lea were mortified by the revised image, but the band agreed to try the idea and adopted Dr Marten boots, braces, cropped hair and aggressive "bovver boy" posturing.

Coinciding with the new image, Ambrose Slade changed their name to "The Slade". Shortly afterwards, Chandler was sent "Wild Winds Are Blowing" by a publishing company. He felt the song, written by Bob Saker and Jack Winsley, was perfect for Slade and had them record it. Released in October 1969 on Fontana, the single failed to chart.

In a 1977 interview, drummer Don Powell singled out the song as the only one embarrassing to him and the band. He said: "There's only one, "Wild Winds are Blowing", but that wasn't one of our songs anyway. That came from the office at Brook Street. We didn't know any better in those days." Lead vocalist Noddy Holder later recalled in his 1999 biography Who's Crazee Now?: "It was a good pop-rock song, not too commercial. It was really our first proper single, although we had released two tracks from Beginnings, neither of which was ever going to be a hit."

== Release ==
"Wild Winds Are Blowing" was released on 7" vinyl by Fontana Records in the UK, Germany and the Netherlands. Both the German and Dutch releases came in a colour picture sleeve. The B-side, "One Way Hotel", was written by Lea, Holder and drummer Don Powell. The song was initially exclusive to the single, but would soon appear as an album track on the band's 1970 album Play It Loud. The original 1969 B-side version features jazzier guitar parts that were removed or replaced for the version that appeared on Play It Loud.

"Wild Winds Are Blowing" later received greater recognition when it was included on the band's 1973 compilation album Sladest. The album topped the UK charts. In 2006, Salvo included the song on The Slade Box and as a bonus track on the double-CD album Beginnings/Play It Loud.

== Promotion ==
A music video was filmed to promote the single. It featured the band performing the song at Philips Studios in London. After remaining unseen for many years, the video surfaced in 2016. To further promote the song, the band made their first national TV appearance on Alan Price's Monster Music Mash. The band performed "Wild Winds Are Blowing" live, along with a cover of The Beatles' "Martha My Dear", which they had covered on Beginnings. The band also appeared on the London news programme Scene at Six, and performed the song during a BBC studio session around the same time. Prior to and on the single's release date, adverts promoting it appeared in New Musical Express.

== Track listing ==
7" Single

1. "Wild Winds Are Blowing" - 3:43
2. "One Way Hotel" - 2:37

== Critical reception ==
Upon release, Disc said: "If they are supposed to be more than just a group cashing in on a fad then one expects a whole new revolutionary sound on record just as The Who presented us with in the days when they presented The Mods. "Wild Winds Are Blowing" has a faintly aggressive vocal with a 'heavy' backing. Nothing particularly stunning, no real 'argo' voice and nothing to wake you from the Sunday afternoon boredom or get you leaping off to football in your hobnail boots! Or in fact anything to make a definite dent in current music." Tony Raba of Wolverhampton Express and Star commented: "On October 24 their first record is released on the Fontana label. "Wild Winds are Blowing" is a powerful commercial number which could put the lads on the chartbound trail."

In a review of the 1973 compilation album Sladest, Music Scene said: "From the days of Ambrose Slade comes "Know Who You Are" and there's Wild Winds Are Blowing" which was their first shot at the charts. The early material lacks the guts of Slade's contemporary football crowd panache, but judging by the number of phone calls and letters we get from fans, there is a lot of interest in the lads' old stuff." Gramophone said: "The historians are sure to be thrilled when hearing their initial recordings for the Fontana label, such as "Wild Winds Are Blowing"..."

In his book The Encyclopedia of Popular Music, author Colin Larkin described the song as "stomping". He added: "Their image as 'bovver boys', complete with cropped hair and Dr Marten boots, provoked some scathing press from a media sensitive to youth culture violence." In The Rough Guide to Rock, Peter Buckley described the song as an "excellent single". Giulio D'Agostino, in his book Glam Musik, described the song as an "excellent, rowdy single".

== Personnel ==
The Slade

- Noddy Holder - lead vocals, guitar
- Dave Hill - lead guitar, backing vocals
- Jim Lea - bass, backing vocals
- Don Powell - drums

Additional personnel

- Chas Chandler - producer for Montgrove Productions
