= Know Who You Are =

Single by Slade

from the album Play It Loud
- B-side: "Dapple Rose"
- Released: 18 September 1970
- Genre: Rock
- Length: 2:53
- Label: Polydor
- Songwriters: Jim Lea, Noddy Holder, Don Powell, Dave Hill
- Producer: Chas Chandler

Slade singles chronology
| "The Shape of Things to Come" (1970) | "Know Who You Are" (1970) | "Get Down and Get with It" (1971) |

"Know Who You Are" is a song by the British rock band Slade, released in 1970 as a second and final single from their second studio album Play It Loud. The song was written by Jim Lea, Noddy Holder, Don Powell and Dave Hill, and produced by Chas Chandler. It failed to make an appearance in the UK chart.

== Background ==
After their 1969 debut, Beginnings failed to break the band, then known as Ambrose Slade, into the UK charts, their new manager Chas Chandler encouraged them to begin writing their own material. He also believed they would benefit from a new look and the band soon adopted a skinhead image. Coinciding with this new image, Ambrose Slade changed their name to "The Slade" and released the failed single "Wild Winds Are Blowing" in October 1969. "Shape of Things to Come" followed in March 1970, but again failed to chart. With this, Chandler moved the band from Fontana to Polydor Records, believing a higher profile label would boost sales. The band then began recording material for their second studio album Play It Loud.

The band's Polydor debut, "Know Who You Are", was released in September 1970, but was also a commercial failure, as was Play It Loud when it was released in November. Lead vocalist Noddy Holder, in his 1999 biography, recalled of the song's failure: "When it didn't make the charts, frustration started to set in. We couldn't understand why we weren't more popular by then. We had been with Chas for two years, slogging our guts out and still we hadn't had a hit." Speaking to Goodtimes Magazine in 2015, bassist Jim Lea recalled: "We had no hits. Songs such as "Know Who You Are" or "Shape of Things to Come" were played on the radio only very infrequently." Afterwards, the band dropped their skinhead image and would achieve their commercial breakthrough with their mid-1971 single "Get Down and Get with It".

"Know Who You Are" developed from the band's 1969 track "Genesis", which was an instrumental written by the band and released as a single from Beginnings. During sessions for Play It Loud, the band revisited the song, with drummer Don Powell writing the lyrics. In his 2013 biography, Powell recalled: ""Know Who You Are" is the same as our old instrumental "Genesis", so Nod and Dave are credited for that one as well as Jim and myself. I wrote the lyrics for it and some of them are about Dave. I don't know how it came about, but the first line that I came up with was "H, old babe, sing a song to make out that your playing is easy.""

== Release ==
"Know Who You Are" was released on 7" vinyl by Polydor Records in the UK only. The B-side, "Dapple Rose", was written by Lea and Powell. Also included on Play It Loud, Powell recalled of his lyrics in a 2009 fan forum interview: "I've always had a fondness for horses and where I lived with my parents there were some fields over the back and there were always gypsies camping there. They used to have these horses and donkeys and they always looked dead to me. They were not looked after which was sad."

Following its lack of success, "Know Who You Are" was quickly deleted by Polydor and has since become a collector's item. The Rare Record Price Guide of 2014 valued the single at £80. The song later received greater recognition when a live version was included on Slade Alive!, which became the band's first hit album when released in 1972. In addition, the original studio version was included on the 1973 compilation album Sladest, which topped the UK charts.

== Promotion ==
The band appeared on the UK show Disco 2 to perform "Know Who You Are" and the Play It Loud track "Sweet Box". The performance was broadcast on 31 October 1970. Only a few performances from the show are known to survive, with Slade's performance having not been seen since its original airing. The band also performed the song during a BBC studio session around the same time.

== Track listing ==
7" Single

1. "Know Who You Are" - 2:53
2. "Dapple Rose" - 3:31

== Critical reception ==
Upon release, New Musical Express said: "A powerful item from the skinhead group, making its Polydor debut. The lyric is forcefully delivered, virtually snarled at times. It's a hard-hitting piece of philosophy with a walloping beat, which explodes into a wall of sound in the title hook. Insistent and gripping, but limited in its appeal." Record Mirror felt the song had "chart chance" and commented: "Chas Chandler, ex-Animal bassist, states categorically that this group will make it. But then he's said that before. About Jimi Hendrix. Lost momentarily in a skin-head scene, this group is basically most musicianly. This is a strange, staccato sort of production... lead voice stamping, as in bovver boots, on the lyrics. Stark simplicity behind. The effect is very good indeed. Darned near slayed me."

In a review of Play It Loud, New Musical Express noted: "Aggressive - that's what the music and vocalising of Slade seems to be, though they vary the volume with great skill, at times quiet, then turning it up and shouting at the listener as in "Know Who You Are"." Joe Viglione of AllMusic retrospectively said: ""Know Who You Are" is a wonderful study here; the band is more proper dipping into that Yardbirds bag again on this original. By the time it was re-released on Slade Alive, only two years later, the song would become part of their glam success. But here, Noddy Holder is kept on key by Chas Chandler, and that restraint makes for an intelligent album of rock which draws from all of the aforementioned sources, Ten Years After, Sabbath, The Move, Yardbirds, as well as the Beatles, Steppenwolf, and Kaleidoscope U.K." Dave Swanson of Ultimate Classic Rock commented: ""Know Who You Are" kicks off side two and remains one of the band's finest-ever songs. Showing off the band well on the way to their definitive sound, it's a Slade classic loaded with that dynamic tension the band would explore to greater success within the next year."

In a review of Slade Alive!, Stephen Cook of AllMusic described the song as "MC5-esque". In a review of Sladest, Gramophone said: "The historians are sure to be thrilled when hearing their initial recordings for the Fontana label and their first Polydor efforts, such as "Know Who You Are"..." Terry Staunton of Record Collector stated: "In addition to the hits they’d already amassed, the album showcases a few of the ones that got away, such as the Quo-like boogie of "Know Who You Are"."

== Personnel ==
Slade

- Noddy Holder - lead vocals, guitar
- Dave Hill - lead guitar, backing vocals
- Jim Lea - bass, backing vocals
- Don Powell - drums

Additional personnel

- Chas Chandler - producer
