= That's What Friends Are For (Slade song) =

Single by Slade

from the album You Boyz Make Big Noize
- B-side: "Wild Wild Party"
- Released: 27 April 1987
- Genre: Rock
- Length: 3:17
- Label: RCA
- Songwriter(s): Noddy Holder; Jim Lea
- Producer(s): Roy Thomas Baker

Slade singles chronology
"Still the Same" (1987)	"That's What Friends Are For" (1987)	"You Boyz Make Big Noize" (1987)

Audio sample
- file; help

That's What Friends Are For is a song by English rock band Slade, released on 27 April 1987 as the second single from their fourteenth and final studio album, You Boyz Make Big Noize. It was written by lead vocalist Noddy Holder and bassist Jim Lea, and was produced by Roy Thomas Baker. "That's What Friends Are For" reached number 95 in the UK Singles Chart.

== Background ==
"That's What Friends Are For" was one of the two tracks from You Boyz Make Big Noize to be produced by Roy Thomas Baker. It was originally intended for Baker to produce the entire album but Slade felt his working methods were too lengthy and expensive. In a 1987 fan club interview, guitarist Dave Hill described the song as "a 'scarf waver' type of number". It was recorded at Wessex Sound Studios.

== Release ==
It was the band's label, RCA, who chose to release "That's What Friends Are For" as a single. Shortly prior to its release, Dave Hill revealed in a 1987 fan club interview that it "looks to be the next single, mainly because there's a certain person up at RCA who is going wally over it". The band wanted to see "Ooh La La in L.A." issued as the album's second UK single but they were overruled by RCA.

== Promotion ==
Slade promoted the song by performing it on the BBC children's show The Krankies Elektronik Komik.

== Critical reception ==
Upon its release, "That's What Friends Are For" was reviewed on the BBC Radio 1 Singled Out programme on 18 April 1987. It received a thumbs up by Welsh singer and presenter Aled Jones, Dominica calypso musician The Wizzard and English radio broadcaster Janice Long. Andy Strickland of Record Mirror wrote, "Yes, they're still at it and thank the heavens for that. This treads the same territory as the present Bon Jovi/Europe records and will probably be a smash." Malcolm Dome of Kerrang! predicted it would be a "guaranteed hit" and remarked, "Anyone who dares to criticise this band obviously hasn't the faintest notion of the true spirit of rock 'n' roll. Yeah, it rips off the keyboard splay of Van Halen's 'Jump' and, yeah, the singalong chorus could well be Chas & Dave, but Noddy's voice still winks at ya and the band can still should-haul a pop/rock ditty like no other." Phil Trow of Signal Radio, writing for the Evening Sentinel, stated, "21 years on Slade are still as commercially acceptable as they were in the 1970s. Bang Bang, Crash Crash... and there's another one for the 50 pence box."

== Formats ==
7-inch single (UK and Australasia)

1. "That's What Friends Are For" – 3:17
2. "Wild Wild Party" – 2:55

12-inch single (UK)

1. "That's What Friends Are For" – 3:17
2. "Hi Ho Silver Lining" – 3:24
3. "Wild Wild Party" – 2:55
4. "Lock Up Your Daughters" (Live Recording) – 4:03

== Personnel ==
Slade

- Noddy Holder – lead vocals
- Jim Lea – synthesiser, bass, backing vocals
- Dave Hill – lead guitar, backing vocals
- Don Powell – drums

Production

- Roy Thomas Baker – production ("That's What Friends Are For")
- Jim Lea – production ("Wild Wild Party" and "Hi Ho Silver Lining"
- Slade – production ("Lock Up Your Daughters")

Other

- Quick On The Draw Ltd – design

== Charts ==
Chart (1987)	Peak position
UK Singles Chart	95
UK Heavy Metal Singles (Spotlight Research)	8
