= Still the Same (Slade song) =

Single by Slade

from the album You Boyz Make Big Noize
- B-side: "Gotta Go Home"
- Released: 2 February 1987
- Recorded: 1986
- Genre: Pop rock
- Length: 3:53
- Label: RCA
- Songwriter(s): Noddy Holder; Jim Lea
- Producer(s): John Punter

Slade singles chronology
| "Do You Believe in Miracles" (1985) | "Still the Same" (1987) | "That's What Friends Are For" (1987) |

Audio sample
- file; help

"Still the Same" is a song by English rock band Slade, released in 1987 as the lead single from their fourteenth and final studio album, You Boyz Make Big Noize. The song was written by lead vocalist Noddy Holder and bassist Jim Lea, and was produced by John Punter. "Still the Same" peaked at number 73 in the UK Singles Chart and remained in the top 100 for four weeks.

== Background ==
Slade began writing and recording material for their You Boyz Make Big Noize album in 1986. Hoping to record a hit album that would put them back in the public eye, "Still the Same" was chosen by RCA as the album's lead single. Plans for a Christmas 1986 release were scrapped and the single was held back until 1987 as an attempt to avoid Slade's label as being a Christmas-only band. Released in February 1987, "Still the Same" reached No. 73 in the UK. In the UK, the single suffered from a lack of radio play; it was only B-Listed on BBC Radio 1, rather than being placed on the A-List.

In a 1987 fan club interview, guitarist Dave Hill spoke of the song's lack of chart success: ""Still the Same" is basically being regarded as a flop in terms of what was expected of it. I think the record company were mostly disappointed, as it was more them than the group who chose it. It was always up for a single though, right from the demo stage. "Still the same" did virtually the same as "My Oh My" chart-wise in its first few weeks, but at the point where "My Oh My" picked up the radio play, "Still the Same" was dropped completely, especially by Radio One." Hill felt the song "deserved to go much higher in the charts than it did".

== Release ==
"Still the Same" was released on 7" and 12" vinyl by RCA Records in the UK, Germany and Portugal. The 12" vinyl was released across other European countries too. The B-side, "Gotta Go Home", was exclusive to the single and would later appear on the band's 2007 compilation B-Sides. In the UK, a special limited edition commemorative version of the single was also issued to mark and celebrate Slade's 21st anniversary. This double pack edition included an additional 7" vinyl with "The Roaring Silence" as the A-side and "Don't Talk to Me About Love" as the B-side. The former track would appear on You Boyz Make Big Noize, while the latter would later be re-used as a B-Side for the band's 1987 single "Ooh La La in L.A.". On the 12" single, an extended version of "Still the Same" was featured as the A-side.

== Promotion ==
No music video was filmed to promote the single. In the UK, the band performed the song on the TV shows The Tom O'Connor Show and Saturday Superstore. To promote the single in record stores, posters were produced, although these were mainly distributed to London retailers.

== Critical reception ==
Upon its release, Paul Henderson of Kerrang! wrote, "I doubt if many of us will have much fun listening to this soggy offering. The uptempo B-side, on the other hand, with its vaguely ZZ Top-ish instrumental middle-eight, is far more listenable and would have stood a much better chance." In a review of You Boyz Make Big Noize, American newspaper Record-Journal said the song was a "hook-filled, powerful tune", "resplendent in its anthemic arrangement and heavenly harmonizing chorus". In a retrospective review, Doug Stone of AllMusic commented: "Slade's headiest daze long gone, the band amazingly squeezes out sparks like "Still the Same": always tunefully tight, but loose enough to sing in the pub."

== Formats ==
7-inch single (UK and Europe)

1. "Still the Same" – 3:53
2. "Gotta Go Home" – 3:18

7-inch commemorative double pack single

1. "Still the Same" – 3:53
2. "Gotta Go Home" – 3:18
3. "The Roaring Silence" – 2:48
4. "Don't Talk to Me About Love" – 2:28

12-inch single

1. "Still the Same" (Extended Version) – 5:33
2. "Gotta Go Home" – 3:18

== Personnel ==
Slade

- Noddy Holder – lead vocals
- Jim Lea – synthesiser, bass, backing vocals
- Dave Hill – lead guitar, backing vocals
- Don Powell – drums

Production

- John Punter – production ("Still the Same")
- Jim Lea – production ("Gotta Go Home", "The Roaring Silence" and "Don't Talk to Me About Love")

Other

- Quick on the Draw – design

== Charts ==
| Chart (1987) | Peak position |
|---|---|
| UK Singles Chart | 73 |
| UK Heavy Metal Singles (Spotlight Research/Gallup) | 8 |

== Cover versions ==
- In 2003, Belgian band Mama's Jasje recorded the song for their fifth studio album Zwart Op Wit. The track was titled "Voor Jou Alleen" which translates to "For You Alone". As a result of the changed lyrics, Peter Van Laet also received a writing credit. The song became a hit in Belgium, peaking at No. 4.
