= You Boyz Make Big Noize (song) =

Single by Slade
- B-side: "You Boyz Make Big Noize" (Instrumental)
- Released: 27 July 1987
- Genre: Rap rock, hard rock
- Length: 3:01
- Label: Cheapskate
- Songwriters: Noddy Holder; Jim Lea
- Producer: Jim Lea

Slade singles chronology
"Ooh La La in L.A." (1987)	"You Boyz Make Big Noize" (1987)	"We Won't Give In" (1987)

Audio sample
- file; help

You Boyz Make Big Noize is a song by English rock band Slade, released on 27 July 1987 as a non-album single. It was written by lead vocalist Noddy Holder and bassist Jim Lea, and was produced by Lea. Named after the band's 1987 album of the same name, the song reached number 94 in the UK Singles Chart and remained in the top 100 for the one week.

The song did not appear on the UK/European release of the You Boyz Make Big Noize album. However, later editions would add the song as the thirteenth track. For the album's CBS release in the United States, "You Boyz Make Big Noize" was included, replacing the fourth track "Fools Go Crazy".

== Background ==
Shortly prior to the release of Slade's fourteenth studio album You Boyz Make Big Noize, the band returned to the recording studio to record a song of the same name. After the album failed to generate the expected level of commercial success, RCA opted not to release the song of the same name, but allowed the band to release it on the independent label Cheapskate. Released in July 1987, it reached No. 94 in the UK. CBS, Slade's American label, liked the song and had it included on the album which was released later in the year.

"You Boyz Make Big Noize" features Beastie Boys rap-styled verses. Prior to the song's release, guitarist Dave Hill described the song as "a rock rap thing with a Beastie Boys feel to it." The song featured vocals from Vicki Brown, and in a 1987 fan club interview, Lea explained how Brown came to be on the song: "She was wandering along a corridor and Noddy said "ere, you're female, do you want to be on our record?" She was not supposed to sing, she was supposed to say two lines but she sang one of the lines and she had this amazing voice. I wish we had written more for her."

== Release ==
"You Boyz Make Big Noize" was released on 7" and 12" vinyl by Cheapskate Records in the UK only. The B-side, "Boyz (Instrumental)", was exclusive to the single and would later appear on the band's 2007 compilation B-Sides. On the 12" single, an extended version of "You Boyz Make Big Noize", dubbed as the "Noize Remix", was featured as the A-side. The lead guitar on the remix was played by Lea. A second B-side was also included; the "U.S.A Mix" of the song. The artwork for the single is the same as that of the You Boyz Make Big Noize album.

== Promotion ==
On 15 August 1987, the band appeared on the ITV show Get Fresh to perform the song, with Bren Laidler miming Vicki Brown's vocal part. The band also performed "Ooh La La in L.A." on the show.

== Critical reception ==
Upon its release, Jon Hotten of Kerrang! wrote, "Never thought I'd find myself saying this after giving the boyz' last album a bit of a slag, but I like it! Especially the 12" Noize remix with the Noddy rap proving they've got the measure of those nasty Beasties, who could learn a lesson or two from the original rabble rousers." Jim Whiteford of The Kilmarnock Standard commented, "They've been mis-spelling their song titles since 1971 and still manage to grab chart positions all these years later. Happy pop with no airs and graces and just enough melody to succeed again." Paul Benbow of the Reading Evening Post stated, "Talking of bad English, these boyz are masters at it. They take on the beasties with the Wolverhampton version." Selina Webb of the Bucks Advertiser awarded three out of five stars and wrote, "Here Slade are doing a Beastie Boys bit which could well get them another hit. But number one? No way."

Phil Trow of Signal Radio, writing for the Evening Sentinel, was critical, "Imagine a group of O.A.P.'s waiting outside the post office launching into a chorus of Beastie Boys music and you've got Noddy Holder and the Boyz' latest release. No chance of being a hit." John Gibson of the Edinburgh Evening News remarked that, with the track, "desperate Slade really do sound like the oldest rock teenagers in the business".

== Formats ==
7-inch single (UK)

1. "You Boyz Make Big Noize" – 3:01
2. "Boyz" (Instrumental) – 3:02

12-inch single (UK)

1. "You Boyz Make Big Noize" (Noize Remix) – 5:31
2. "You Boyz Make Big Noize" (Instrumental Boyz Version) – 3:01
3. "You Boyz Make Big Noize" (The USA Mix) – 3:00

== Personnel ==
Slade

- Noddy Holder – lead vocals
- Dave Hill – lead guitar, vocals
- Jim Lea – bass, vocals
- Don Powell – drums

Additional musicians

- Vicki Brown – vocals

Production

- Jim Lea – production

== Charts ==
Chart (1987)	Peak position
UK Singles Chart	94
UK Heavy Metal Singles (Spotlight Research)	12
