= We Won't Give In =

Single by Slade

from the album You Boyz Make Big Noize
- B-side: "Ooh La La in L.A."
- Released: 23 November 1987
- Recorded: 1987
- Length: 3:38
- Label: Cheapskate
- Songwriter(s): Noddy Holder; Jim Lea
- Producer(s): Jim Lea

Slade singles chronology
"You Boyz Make Big Noize" (1987)	"We Won't Give In" (1987)	"Let's Dance" (1988)

Audio sample
- file; help

"We Won't Give In" is a song by English rock band Slade which originally appeared on the soundtrack of the 1986 British drama film Knights & Emeralds. The song was written by lead vocalist Noddy Holder and bassist Jim Lea, and was produced by Lea. In 1987, it was released as the fourth and final single from the band's fourteenth studio album, You Boyz Make Big Noize, and reached number 121 in the UK Singles Chart.

== Background ==
"We Won't Give In" was written and recorded in 1986 for the soundtrack of the British drama film Knights & Emeralds, alongside another song, "Wild Wild Party", after Slade were approached by the film's producers. Holder has described "We Won't Give In" as a "heavy ballad" and "Wild Wild Party" as a "real party record" and a "big stomping rocker". In addition to appearing in the film, both tracks were included on the accompanying soundtrack, released by 10 Records on vinyl and cassette in September 1986. The label was originally interested in releasing "We Won't Give In" as a single from the soundtrack but the band's label, RCA, refused to give permission. Guitarist Dave Hill told the Slade Fan Club in 1987, "This was thought by many people to be a good one for a single when it came out last year on the film soundtrack. The film company wanted it out as a single but RCA, who owned the rights, said no."

"We Won't Give In" was also included on the band's fourteenth studio album, You Boyz Make Big Noize, released by RCA in April 1987. The disappointing commercial success of the album and its singles led RCA to drop Slade. Later in the year, the band decided to release "We Won't Give In" as a single over the Christmas period through their own independent label, Cheapskate, with the permission of RCA/BMG. The single was Jim Lea's idea and, although the rest of the band initially expressed reservations, the band ultimately decided to release it. In a September 1987 interview for the Slade Fan Club, Lea revealed,

"I want to release 'We Won't Give In' as a single this Christmas. I feel that it is a good idea because whichever way you look at it, we have the wind blowing behind us at that time of year. Last Christmas we were offered five TV shows and we hadn't even got anything out. Unfortunately, at the moment, nobody else seems to share my point of view over this and would rather keep Slade away from Christmas this year. There is a sort of wound licking process going on internally within the band which is understandable. We have spent the past two years recording and then promoting the new album but haven't seen any reward for our efforts in terms of chart success."

Released on 23 November 1987, the single failed to reach the top 100 of the UK Singles Chart, stalling at number 121. It was the first Slade UK single (of new material) not to reach the top 100 since 1981's "Knuckle Sandwich Nancy". In a 1988 fan club interview, drummer Don Powell said of the failure of the "You Boyz Make Big Noize" and "We Won't Give In" singles, "I really don't know why we have problems like that. We seem to get the token plays, but the records tend not to bite and get dropped. Obviously we are disappointed and will have to decide what we are going to do next. At the moment, no one in the UK seems to want to know." Holder added in a 1988 interview, "Everyone we spoke to loved both of those records but they just didn't catch on at all."

== Promotion ==
On 21 December 1987, the band appeared on BBC One's lunchtime show Daytime Live and performed "We Won't Give In". They also performed "Merry Xmas Everybody" but without guitarist Dave Hill; comedian Eddie Large, who was a fellow guest on the show, told Slade his lifelong ambition was to play on stage with them and so Hill let him take his place when performing the song.

== Critical reception ==
Upon its release as a single, Chris Welch of Kerrang! wrote, "Slade have a habit of getting a big hit every five years just when they seem to be on the way out again, and this might well do it for them. It's rather slow and measured and a shade gloomy for Christmas fare, but it's good to hear Noddy Holder roaring away." Nicky Brown of the Gateshead Post remarked, "Not while the royalties from 'Merry Xmas Everybody' keep rolling in, eh lads! Toytown rock from people who don't know any better." In 2007, rock music journalist Chris Ingham described the song as "the closest thing to a bona fide Slade classic on the album" and added, "A rousing, attractive anthem of resolution in the face of harshness, it rings out like a theme song for Slade and their inspiring tenacity."

== Formats ==
7-inch single (UK)

1. "We Won't Give In" – 3:38
2. "Ooh La La In L.A." – 3:52

== Personnel ==
Slade

- Noddy Holder – lead vocals
- Dave Hill – lead guitar, backing vocals
- Jim Lea – keyboards, bass, backing vocals
- Don Powell – drums

Production

- Jim Lea – production ("We Won't Give In")
- John Punter – production ("Ooh La La in L.A.")

== Charts ==
Chart (1987–1988)	Peak position
UK Singles Chart	121
UK Heavy Metal Singles (Spotlight Research)	14
