= The Bangin' Man =

Single by Slade
- B-side: "She Did It to Me"
- Released: 28 June 1974
- Genre: Rock
- Length: 4:10
- Label: Polydor
- Songwriters: Noddy Holder, Jim Lea
- Producer: Chas Chandler

Slade singles chronology
"When the Lights Are Out" (1974)	"The Bangin' Man" (1974)	"Far Far Away" (1974)

Audio sample
- file; help

"The Bangin' Man" is a song by the British rock band Slade, released in 1974 as a non-album single. It was written by lead vocalist Noddy Holder and bassist Jim Lea, and produced by Chas Chandler. It reached No. 3 in the UK, remaining in the charts for seven weeks. The song was certified UK Silver by BPI for sales over 250,000 that same year.

== Background ==
After the release of "Everyday" as a single in March 1974, the band soon returned to the studio to record a follow-up. Returning to a more rock-based sound, "The Bangin' Man" was released in June 1974. It reached No. 3 in the UK, giving the band their twelfth UK hit. "The Bangin' Man" was written while the band were touring Australia. The song's lyrics refer to Slade's tour manager Graham "Swinn" Swinnerton, who had the job of waking each band member up in their hotel rooms, ready to head on to the next destination of their tour.

== Release ==
"The Bangin' Man" was released on 7" vinyl by Polydor Records in the UK, Ireland, across Europe, Scandinavia, Yugoslavia, America, Australia, New Zealand and Japan. The B-side, "She Did It to Me", was exclusive to the single and would later appear on the band's 2007 compilation B-Sides. Although the song was a non-album single elsewhere, "The Bangin' Man" was included on the United States Warner Bros. Records release of Slade in Flame in 1975.

== Promotion ==
No music video was filmed to promote the single. The band performed the song on the UK ITV show Supersonic and the German TV show Disco. The band also performed the song on the Dutch AVRO TV show TopPop. The song was not performed on the UK music show Top of the Pops due to a BBC strike.

== Critical reception ==
Upon release, Record Mirror described the song as a "dramatically direct commercial song" with "plenty of space for guitar work". Sounds commented: "Slade are getting very good at getting the details right these days. All the playing is excellent; strong direct drumming, forceful bass and some lead guitar that would knock spots off some of our guitar heroes, and Noddy is singing better than he has ever before." In a retrospective review of Slade in Flame, Geoff Ginsberg of AllMusic said the song was "definitely one of Slade's best, and worth seeking out on a greatest-hits CD."

== Track listing ==
7" Single

1. "The Bangin' Man" - 4:10
2. "She Did it to Me" - 3:16

== Personnel ==
Slade

- Noddy Holder - lead vocals, rhythm guitar
- Dave Hill - lead guitar, backing vocals
- Jim Lea - bass, backing vocals
- Don Powell - drums

Additional personnel

- Chas Chandler - producer

== Charts ==
Chart (1974)	Peak position
Australia (Kent Music Report)	48
Belgium (Ultratop 50 Flanders)	18
Belgium (Ultratop 50 Wallonia)	28
Ireland (IRMA)	3
Netherlands (Dutch Top 40)	22
Netherlands (Single Top 100)	18
New Zealand (Listener)	11
Norway (VG-lista)	4
UK Singles (OCC)	3
West Germany (GfK)	7
