= Do You Believe in Miracles (song) =

Single by Slade

from the album Crackers
- B-side: "My Oh My (Swing version)"
- Released: 22 November 1985
- Genre: Pop rock
- Length: 4:11
- Label: RCA
- Songwriter(s): Noddy Holder; Jim Lea
- Producer(s): John Punter

Slade singles chronology
"Little Sheila" (1985)	"Do You Believe in Miracles" (1985)	"Still the Same" (1987)

Audio sample
- file; help

"Do You Believe in Miracles" is a song by English rock band Slade, released in 1985 as a single. It was also included on the band's studio/compilation album Crackers (1985). The song was written by lead vocalist Noddy Holder and bassist Jim Lea, and was produced by John Punter. It reached number 54 in the UK Singles Chart and remained in the top 100 for six weeks.

== Background ==
"Do You Believe in Miracles" was inspired by Bob Geldof, with Holder's lyrics reflecting his thoughts on Geldof's achievement with Live Aid and also referencing Slade's past encounter with him in the late 1970s, at a time when the band's popularity was low and they had returned to playing smaller venues. Appearing on the TV show Juice in 1985, Lea said of the song, "It's about Bob Geldof actually. When the group was down the nick he came to see us and he said, 'How can a group that's so big be playing a little club like you're playing now?' And we said, 'Well, we just decided to carry on, we didn't want to pack [it] up.' And he said, 'Oh, I couldn't do that' but he did, and then he did the Live Aid thing, and I thought it was worth writing a song about."

Holder also recounted the story to The London Standard in 1985, "We wanted to write a modern day folk song and we remembered bumping into Bob a [few] years ago when the Rats were big and we were at rock bottom. We were playing a small club and he asked us how we could bear to do that after having been a big name band. He said he'd never do it, but a couple of years later, there he was. We were very touched by the Band Aid event." He added to the Daily Mirror, "He's really nice, and needed to be bloody-minded to achieve what he did at Live Aid."

== Release ==
"Do You Believe in Miracles" was released as a charity single, with all publishing royalties being donated equally to the Band Aid Trust and NSPCC. In a 1988 fan club interview, Lea revealed of the money raised by the single, "It's still coming in all the time. I actually got a letter about six week ago where sales have been dribbling in all over the place from Crackers as well as the single. Certainly a few thousand pounds has been paid over and I keep getting these very nice letters all the time saying 'Thank you very much, Mr Lea'."

In 1985, Slade were approached by Telstar Records with the opportunity of releasing a Christmas-related party album. Crackers was made up of a selection of newly recorded covers and some of the band's previous hits. Although the band had not intended for "Do You Believe in Miracles" to be included on the album, Telstar insisted and an agreement was struck with the band and their label RCA. In a 1986 fan club interview, drummer Don Powell revealed, "That was one of the bones of contention – Telstar said that they wanted it on the album, whereas we didn't because that would mean it would split the sales between the single and the album. I know that if I personally like someone's single and it's going to be on their latest album then I'll wait and buy the album."

Speaking of the song's reception, Powell said in a 1986 fan club interview, "It didn't do too well chartwise, but it had every radio play in the book really. I could never turn the radio on without hearing it played. The radio play was incredible, even our plugger, Alan James, couldn't understand it." Lea also remarked in a 1986 fan club interview, "'Do You Believe in Miracles' was played to death on the beeb. I really believed in that record. I didn't like the sound of it on the radio though. I tried to combat that in my own way, but we'd reached the fourth mix of that single and by then I think everybody was past doing another mix. I was happy with the first mix because I knew it would have sounded good on the radio."

== Music video ==
The song's music video was directed by Phillip Davey and was put together from scenes shot in three different settings. One of these is based in an attic, where Holder, wearing a smoking jacket and accompanied by a black cat, is initially seen peering through a telescope before sitting at a large desk to plot the course of Halley's Comet. In a later reappearance of the attic, both Holder and Lea are seen performing the song at the desk, and for the closing scene in the video, all four band members are seen in there, taking it in turns to look through the telescope except for Dave Hill who has the black cat in his arms. The second setting features the band performing the song in front of a white curtain backdrop, and the third and final one shows them performing the song on stage in front of a small audience. All four band members, except for Powell, play on acoustic guitars and there is a mass of lit candles behind them.

== Critical reception ==
Upon its release, Mick Wall of Kerrang! wrote, "The new Slade single [is] good and all, but... why oh why do they persist with these quasi-Celtic arm-wavers for their singles? It's all so predictable. Still, there's obviously life in the old dogs yet." Jack Barron of Sounds noted that "Noddy and the Nerds go philanthropic" and continued, "They tried pills for this state and decided instead that publishing royalties would be split between Band Aid and NSPCC. Laudable indeed, criminal tune though." Australian newspaper The Age stated, "Even if Bob Geldof misses out on this year's Nobel Peace Prize for his Live Aid triumph, at least he would have been immortalised in song by Slade. This ditty is a tribute to Geldof's efforts."

== Formats ==
7-inch single (UK, Europe and Ecuador)

1. "Do You Believe in Miracles" – 4:11
2. "My Oh My" (Swing Version) – 3:02

7-inch single with free bonus single (UK)

1. "Do You Believe in Miracles" – 4:11
2. "My Oh My" (Swing Version)" – 3:02
3. "Santa Claus Is Coming to Town" – 2:39
4. "Auld Lang Syne/You'll Never Walk Alone" – 3:28

7-inch single (Australasia)

1. "Do You Believe in Miracles" – 4:11
2. "Time to Rock" – 4:08

12-inch single (UK, Europe and Australasia)

1. "Do You Believe in Miracles" (Extended Version) – 6:12
2. "My Oh My" (Swing Version) – 3:02
3. "Time to Rock" – 4:08

12-inch "The Slade Christmas Pack" (UK)

1. "Do You Believe in Miracles" – 4:11
2. "My Oh My" (Swing Version) – 3:02
3. "Time to Rock" – 4:08
4. "Santa Claus Is Coming to Town" – 2:39
5. "Auld Lang Syne/You'll Never Walk Alone" – 3:28

== Personnel ==
Slade

- Noddy Holder – lead vocals
- Jim Lea – bass, synthesiser, backing vocals
- Dave Hill – lead guitar, backing vocals
- Don Powell – drums

Production

- John Punter – production ("Do You Believe in Miracles")
- Monty Babson – production ("My Oh My" 'swing version')
- Stan Butcher – arrangement ("My Oh My" 'swing version')
- Jim Lea – production ("Time to Rock", "Santa Claus is Coming to Town" and "Auld Lang Syne/You'll Never Walk Alone"), arrangement ("Do You Believe in Miracles")

Other

- The Clinic – sleeve design and illustration

== Charts ==
Chart (1985)	Peak position
European Airplay Top 50 (Eurotipsheet)	48
UK Singles Chart	54
UK Heavy Metal Singles (Spotlight Research)	7
