= Ooh La La in L.A. =

Single by Slade

from the album You Boyz Make Big Noize
- B-side: "Don't Talk to Me About Love"
- Released: 10 July 1987 (US)
- Genre: Hard rock
- Length: 3:50
- Label: RCA (Germany): CBS (US)
- Songwriters: Noddy Holder; Jim Lea
- Producer: John Punter

Slade singles chronology
| "That's What Friends Are For" (1987) | "Ooh La La in L.A." (1987) | "You Boyz Make Big Noize" (1987) |

"Ooh La La in L.A." is a song by English rock band Slade, released in 1987 as the third single from their fourteenth studio album, You Boyz Make Big Noize. The song was written by lead vocalist Noddy Holder and bassist Jim Lea, and was produced by John Punter.

== Background ==
Slade began writing and recording material for their You Boyz Make Big Noize album in 1986. Hoping to record a hit album that would put them back in the public eye, You Boyz Make Big Noize was released in 1987, however both the album and its singles "Still the Same" and "That's What Friends Are For" all failed to achieve the expected level of commercial success. During the summer of 1987, "Ooh La La in L.A." was released as the album's third single, but mainly in Germany only, with CBS also releasing it in America as a promotional single. It was not a commercial success in Germany and did not achieve enough airplay on American radio, except in Los Angeles, to warrant CBS giving it a full release. The song would be Slade's last release through RCA Records.

"Ooh La La in L.A." had been written during the time of the band's 1985 album Rogues Gallery. The lyrics, written by Holder, details the band's experiences in America while promoting their 1984 hit single "Run Runaway". The song also refers to the brief headline news that drummer Don Powell was dating Bob Dylan's daughter. In a 1987 fan club interview, guitarist Dave Hill picked the song as his favourite from the album, stating: "There is something about the chorus on this one. It is a very different sort of song for Slade. The lyric is very autobiographical. One verse is about Don being pissed all the time. There is mention of the Sunset Marquee, where a lot of bands stay. There is a verse about Barney's Beanery, where we used to play pool all the time."

In Russia, "Ooh La La in L.A." remains one of the band's most popular songs. In a 2011 interview on Vintage TV, Hill said: ""Ooh La La in L.A." was never a hit for us, but in Russia it's huge. And it's a bit like how come it's huge in this massive country and yet it didn't happen here?"

== Release ==
"Ooh La La in L.A." was released on 7" and 12" vinyl by RCA Records across Europe. In America, it was released as a promotional-only 12" vinyl. RCA also released the single as a promotional-only release in Mexico, while a Japanese promotional single was also released, featuring "Ooh La La in L.A." as the A-side and American band Autograph's "Loud and Clear" on the B-side.

The B-side on the German release was "Don't Talk to Me About Love", which had previously appeared as a B-side on the double pack edition of the band's "Still the Same" single. On the 12" single, a second B-side, "That's What Friends Are For", taken from You Boyz Make Big Noize, was also included. The artwork for the single was the same as used for the earlier 1987 single "That's What Friends Are For".

== Promotion ==
A music video to promote the single in America was planned if the promotional single gained sufficient airplay to warrant a full release of the single. In a fan club newsletter of the time, it was revealed that the video would be filmed in Los Angeles. However, the video did not come to fruition, with Lea stating in a 1987 fan club interview: "Well, when you are dealing with record companies, it all comes down to money, power strokes and the way they think a record is going to go. CBS deliberately held back on doing the video because, although they could see it picking up a few heavyweight stations, they wanted to wait to see if it picked up any more."

In the UK, the band performed the song on the ITV show Get Fresh in August 1987, while promoting their UK-only single "You Boyz Make Big Noize".

== Critical reception ==
Upon its release in the US, the radio trade magazine The Hard Report selected "Ooh La La in L.A." as one of the "frontrunners" for radio play and considered it to "show a whole new side to the band". They noted Holder's "distinctive delivery which almost offers a Collinsesque twist this time around" and added, "One has to marvel at how the vocal equivalent of the Grand Canyon can seemingly add even more gravel, complete with newfound trills, which we've certainly heard before." The reviewer concluded, "It's got to be their widest demo offering ever, with a pop hook you know will cause havoc on both sides of the dial. An easy call for their biggest hit of the 80s." FMQB picked it as a "sure shot" and commented that, like their 1984 hits 'Run Runaway' and 'My Oh My', "the 1987 model of the mighty Slade machine hones in on roundhouse melodies, flawless production, and a sound that rocks but doesn't crunch". They noted the 'Roxanne'-like rhythm guitar chords", Holder's "rabble-rousing voice" and lyrics which take "a witty look at life on the road in America from a Brit's perspective". The magazine concluded, "Slade just turned 21, and it's hard-driving, good-humored boyz noize like this that's made them one of the most durable bands of them all." In a retrospective review of You Boyz Make Big Noize, Doug Stone of AllMusic described the song as an "anthemic and trashy barnstormer".

== Formats ==
7" Single (European release)

1. "Ooh La La In L.A." - 3:38
2. "Don't Talk to Me About Love" - 2:28

7" Single (Mexican promo)

1. "Ooh La La In L.A." - 3:52
2. "Ooh La La In L.A." - 3:52

7" Single (Japanese promo)

1. "Slade - Ooh La La In L.A." - 3:52
2. "Autograph - Loud and Clear" - 3:40

12" Single (European release)

1. "Ooh La La In L.A." - 3:52
2. "Don't Talk to Me About Love" - 2:28
3. "That's What Friends are For" - 3:16

12" Single (US promo)

1. "Ooh La La In L.A." - 3:48
2. "Ooh La La In L.A." - 3:48

== Personnel ==
Slade

- Noddy Holder – lead vocals
- Dave Hill – lead guitar, backing vocals
- Jim Lea – bass, backing vocals
- Don Powell – drums

Production

- John Punter – production ("Ooh La La in L.A.")
- Jim Lea – production ("Don't Talk to Me About Love")
- Roy Thomas Baker – production ("That's What Friends Are For")

Other

- Quick on the Draw – sleeve design (RCA release)
