= Noddy Holder =

English musician and actor (born 1946)

Noddy Holder MBE
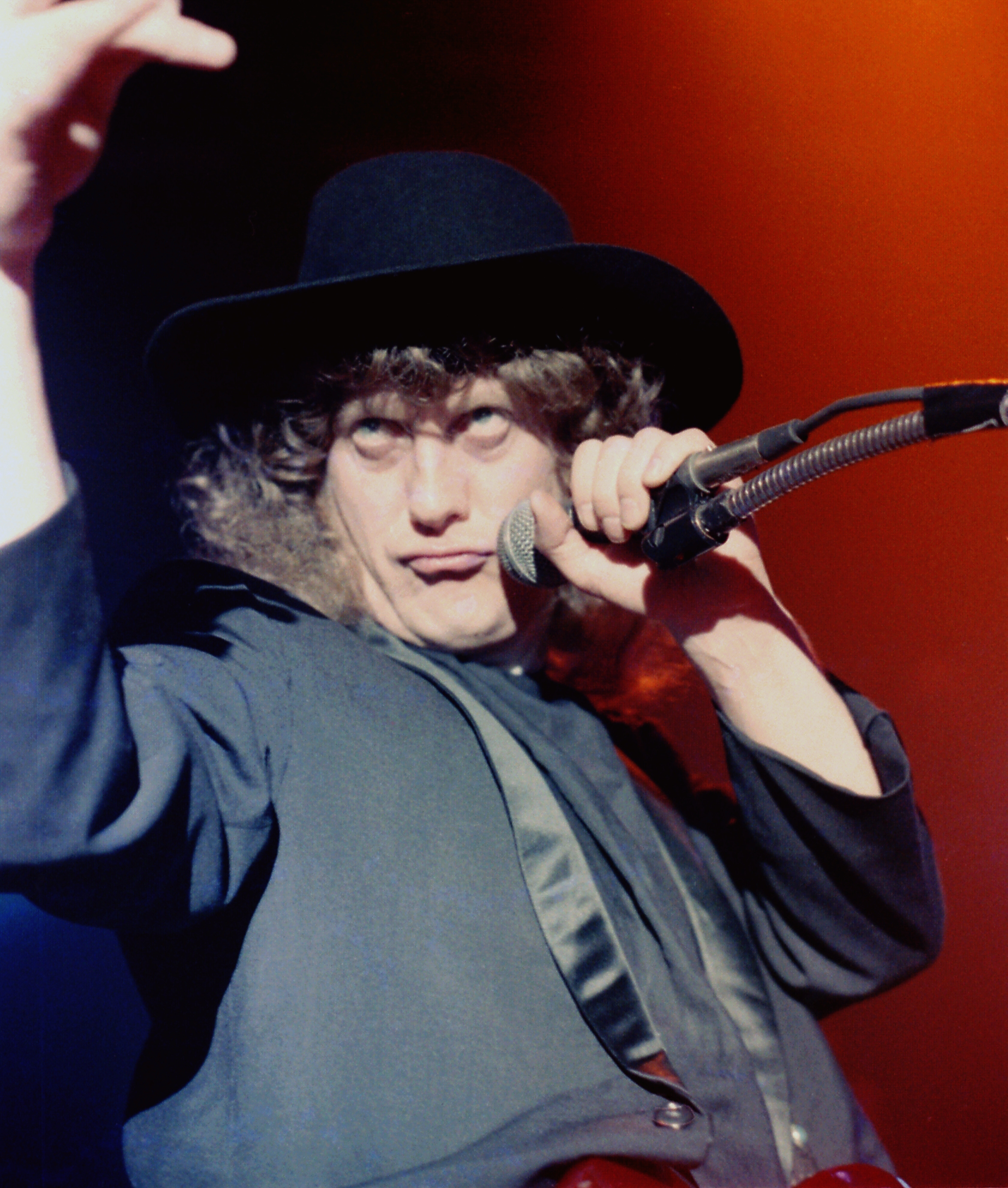
- Holder performing in 1981
- Born: Neville John Holder; 15 June 1946 (age 80); Walsall, Staffordshire, England
- Other name: Sir Nodward of Holdershire
- Occupations: Musician; singer; songwriter; writer; broadcaster
- Years active: 1966–present
- Spouses: Leandra Russell (m. 1976; div. 1984) Suzan Price (m. 2004)
- Children: 3
- Musical career
- Genres: Glam rock; hard rock
- Instruments: Vocals; guitar
- Formerly of: Slade
- Noddy Holder's voice Holder speaking in 2014
- Website: noddyholder.com

Neville John "Noddy" Holder (born 15 June 1946) is an English musician, songwriter and actor. He was the lead vocalist and rhythm guitarist of the English rock band Slade, one of the UK's most successful acts of the 1970s.

Known for his distinctive, powerful and wide-ranging voice, Holder co-wrote most of Slade's material with bass guitarist Jim Lea, including "Mama Weer All Crazee Now", "Cum On Feel the Noize" and "Merry Xmas Everybody". After leaving Slade in 1992, he diversified into television and radio work, notably starring in the ITV comedy-drama series The Grimleys (1999–2001).

== Early life ==
Neville John Holder was born on 15 June 1946 in the Caldmore area, near the centre of Walsall, Staffordshire, England. (Note: Walsall was within Staffordshire at the time of Holder's birth, though it is now within West Midlands.) When he was seven he moved with his family to the Beechdale Estate, a council estate in the north of the town which was also home to Rob Halford, later of Judas Priest. He acquired his nickname at infants' school for his habit of nodding to teachers instead of saying "yes".

The son of a window cleaner, in 1957 Holder passed the eleven plus exam and attended a grammar school for a year until it closed. He then attended the new T. P. Riley Community School (which became a comprehensive school in 1964) and passed six GCE O-level exams.

He formed a group called the Rockin' Phantoms with schoolfriends at the age of 13, and with money earned from a part-time job, he bought a guitar and an amplifier. He also used his father's window-cleaning van to drive Robert Plant (who would later go on to co-found Led Zeppelin) to gigs with Plant's band at the time, the Tennessee Teens. Holder left school during his A-levels after "falling well behind" from performing around the Midlands with the Rockin' Phantoms.

Holder started his own band called the Memphis Cutouts and then, with Steve Brett & The Mavericks in the early 1960s, recorded four singles for EMI's Columbia label.

== Breakthrough career ==
=== Slade ===
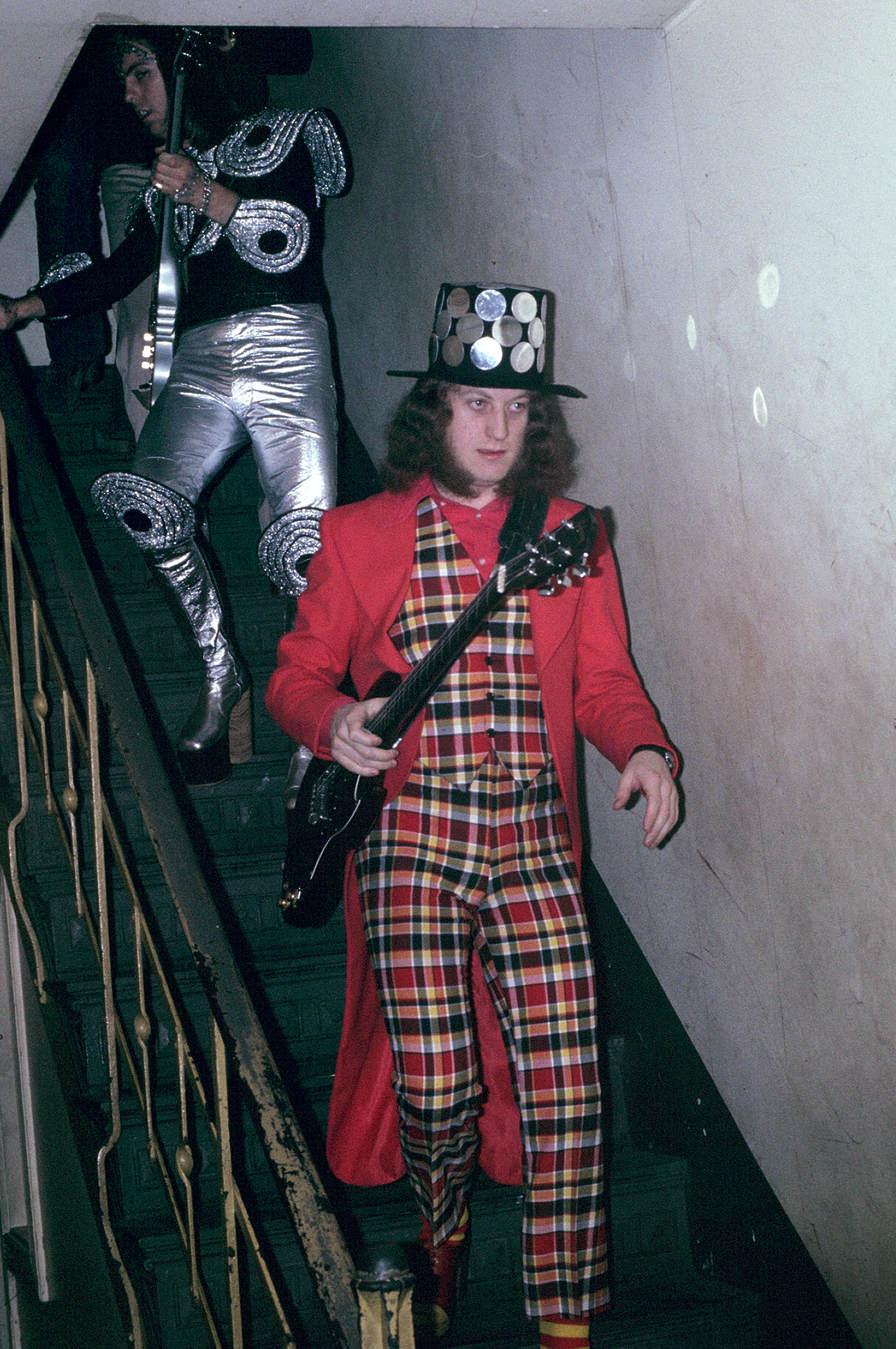
Holder in his stage gear, in 1973, with Dave Hill behind him

In 1966, drummer Don Powell persuaded Holder to join The N' Betweens, a group which already included guitarist Dave Hill and bass guitarist/keyboard player/violinist/songwriter Jim Lea. Together the four formed the band Ambrose Slade, who later became Slade, one of Britain's top-selling rock bands. Lea and Holder composed together almost all of Slade's songs. The band's original line-up clocked up 21 hit singles and released 15 albums.

Slade are particularly remembered for "Merry Xmas Everybody", written by Holder and Lea. As a single, it became the band's sixth number one and the third Slade single to enter the UK Singles Chart at number one. It has sold 1.32 million copies in the UK alone.

After 26 years with Slade, Holder left in 1992, to pursue a career away from music, with regular stints as radio presenter, television personality, actor and voice-over artist.

=== Other work ===
In 1980, after the death of Bon Scott, Holder was offered the chance to join AC/DC but declined because, as he put it, "my loyalty was to Slade".

During 1982, Holder branched into production and worked with his old school friend Phil Burnell and his band Three Phase on one single, "All I Want To Do Is (Fall in Love With You)", which was the band's only release. Holder and Burnell produced the single together, and it was published under Noddy Holder Music Ltd./Whild John Music Ltd., and released via Speed Records. The single received limited promotion, and did not enter the UK chart.

During late 1983, Holder did some production work with American band the First, who came over to the UK from Boston, Massachusetts, especially to work with him – although no material was released. Also in late 1983, Holder and Lea together produced Girlschool's album Play Dirty – which featured two Holder/Lea tracks, "Burning in the Heat of Love" and "High and Dry". In 1985, Holder co-wrote, and sang backing vocals on, the single "Citizen Kane" which Lea released under his own name.

In 1988, Holder recorded "Tear into the Weekend" for a Pepsi commercial in Canada. In 1989, he provided vocals to help out Dave Hill and his newly formed group Blessings in Disguise – which featured Craig Fenney, Bob Lamb, and ex-Wizzard keyboard player Bill Hunt. The debut single, released in 1989 for the Christmas market, was a cover of the Everly Brothers' "Crying in the Rain", backed by a Hill/Hunt composition, "Wild Nights". The band also recorded a cover of the Elvis Presley song "A Fool Such As I" which was not released. The follow-up and final Blessings in Disguise single, "Chance to Be", did not feature Holder.

Holder also appeared on the television panel game Pop Quiz, hosted by Mike Read.

=== Post-Slade ===
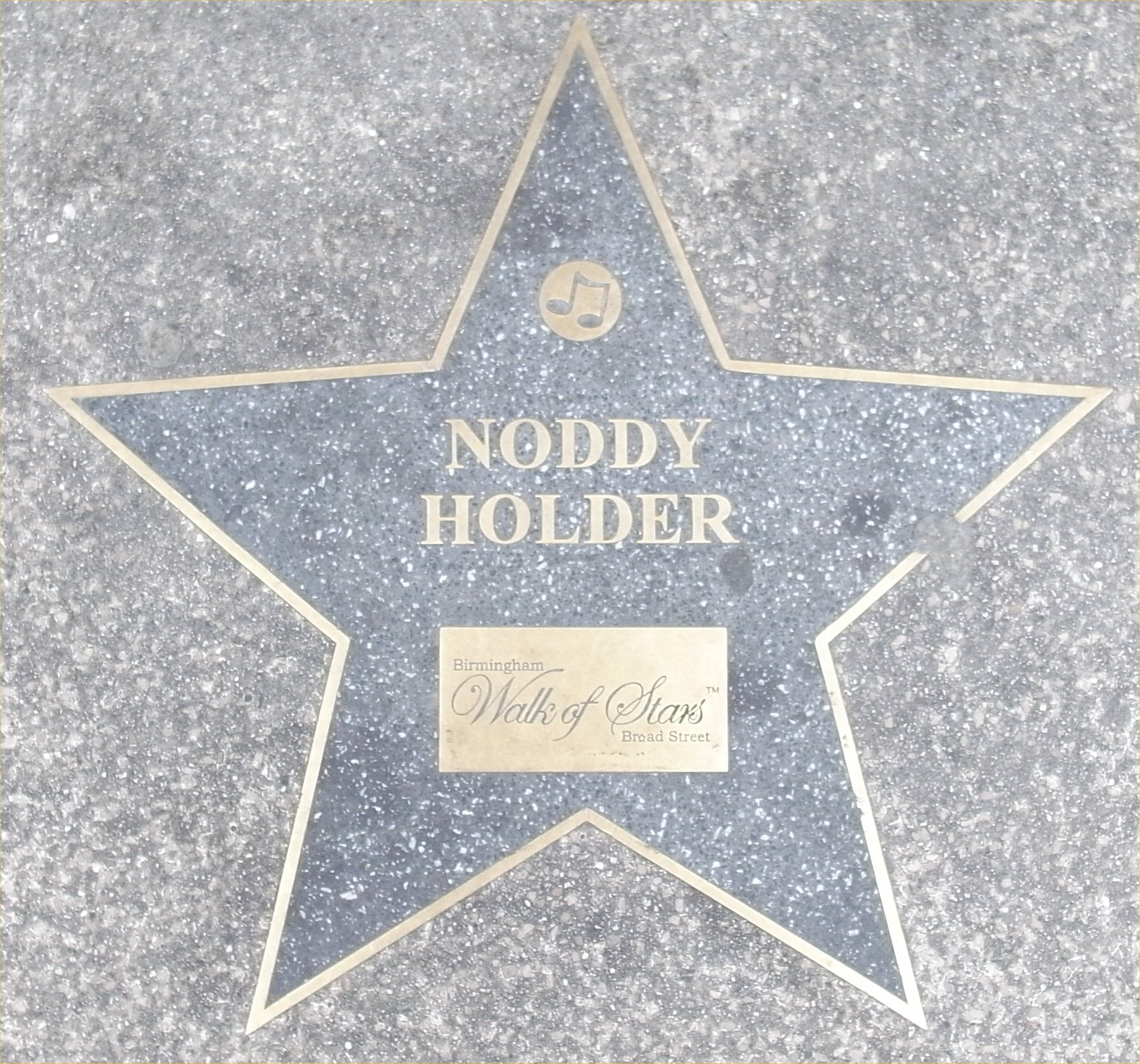
Birmingham Walk of Stars on Broad Street, Birmingham

Since his departure from Slade in 1992, Holder has appeared on hundreds of TV shows, most notably the ITV comedy/drama series The Grimleys (1999–2001) as classical music teacher Neville Holder. For the series, Holder recorded acoustic versions of the Slade songs "Coz I Luv You", "Cum on Feel the Noize", "Mama Weer All Crazee Now" and "Everyday".

He had his own radio shows on Piccadilly 1152 and Key 103 in Manchester, which were syndicated around the country throughout the 1990s, then on Century and Capital Radio syndication from 2000 to 2004.

In 1996, Holder was the subject of the This Is Your Life TV show. He also presented 31 episodes of Noddy's Electric Ladyland, a surreal television quiz show. He was a team captain in BBC1's music series A Question of Pop and was immortalised as a puppet character Banger on the TV show Bob the Builder. In 1999, Holder's autobiography, Who's Crazee Now?, was published by Ebury. Updated in paperback in 2001 it is still available online. It was written by Holder with Lisa Verrico.

Holder was awarded the MBE in the 2000 honours list for his services to showbusiness. In 2001, he was awarded the Gold Badge of Merit by the British Academy of Composers and Songwriters. On 8 December 2000, Holder made a cameo appearance on a live episode of Granada Television's Coronation Street, marking the soap's 40th anniversary. He played a character called Stan, who was saving the street's cobbles from being replaced. Holder voiced the lift announcements at the Walsall New Art Gallery. In November 2004, he made a guest appearance in Peter Kay's Max and Paddy's Road to Nowhere, in which he played a garage mechanic called Mick Bustin. The scenes were filmed in Bolton.

Also for the past 25 years Holder has voiced, sung and appeared in many adverts for TV, film and radio worldwide. In 2006, Holder made a guest appearance in a music video for the Misty's Big Adventure single, "Fashion Parade". Holder was a regular TV critic and contributor to The Radcliffe and Maconie Show on BBC Radio 2 for eight years, and the three often talked about rock star gossip from all eras. Radcliffe often refers to Holder as 'Sir Nodward of Holdershire'.

To celebrate his 50th year in entertainment, Holder toured the UK during May 2013 with Mark Radcliffe for a series of intimate 'In conversation with' shows. Venues for the spring part of the tour include Bolton, Leeds, Durham, Telford, Preston, Redditch, Buxton and Harrogate. During the shows Holder performed some acoustic numbers.

Holder was the third celebrity to be inducted onto the Birmingham Walk of Stars. 27,000 people turned out to his induction ceremony, which took place on 9 December 2007 at Birmingham's 2007 Canal Boat Light Parade. Since Christmas 2007, Holder has annually recorded a TV show countdown of hit Christmas tunes. He is the Nobby's Nuts mascot, following on from a TV campaign. Holder also made an appearance on the 2008 Xmas edition of BBC's humorous news quiz show Have I Got News for You, as a member of Paul Merton's team. In January 2010, Holder and his wife appeared on All Star Mr & Mrs on ITV, where they won the £30,000 jackpot for the NSPCC charity. In 2011, Holder as 'King of the Sizzle' fronted British Sausage Week, touring the country to find the Best British Bangers and to promote support for British farmers and butchers. Holder featured as "Geoff's Dad" in the BBC Radio 4 comedy Hobby Bobbies. Series 1 was broadcast in July/August 2013 and Series 2 in November/December 2014.

On 24 June 2014, Holder was awarded the freedom of his home town of Walsall, making him an honorary freeman of the borough. On 25 September 2014, Holder released his second book via Constable, titled The World According to Noddy. In December 2015, he appeared as a presenter on BBC television's Songs of Praise. On Christmas Day 2015, Holder appeared in a cameo role in BBC Television's Mrs Brown's Boys. In 2018, Holder appeared as a panellist on the Christmas special of BBC television's Would I Lie to You?

A life size statue of Holder, made of Lego, is displayed in Birmingham every Christmas as a charity focal point, with all proceeds going to Birmingham Children's Cancer Hospital. In November 2022, Holder was featured shouting the slogan "It's Christmas" from Slade's "Merry Xmas Everybody" song, in high street retailer Iceland's Christmas television advertising for their range of party foods, with a voice-over by actor Brian Blessed. The campaign followed a series of teasers posted on Iceland's official social media channels and website featuring Holder with the hashtag #NotYetNoddy.

To mark his 60th professional year in showbiz, Noddy returned to the stage in 2023. He completed a series of sold out shows with the Tom Seals Band, a young ten-piece boogie jazz ensemble.

== Personal life ==
Holder married dress designer Leandra Russell in 1976. They had two daughters and divorced in 1984. In 2004, Holder married television producer Suzan Price, with whom he has a son, Django (named after Django Reinhardt). Today, Holder lives in Prestbury, Cheshire.

In 2018, Holder was diagnosed with oesophageal cancer and was expected to live another six months. He underwent experimental chemotherapy treatment at the Christie Hospital in Manchester to which he "responded well". His battle with cancer was made public in 2023 by his wife Suzan in her monthly column for Cheshire Life magazine. She stated that the "experts never like to use the word 'cure', but five years later and he's feeling good and looking great". Holder told The Big Issue that he kept his condition private, except to family and close friends, as he did not want people to "think of me as a cancer victim".

== Discography ==
- Slade discography

== Bibliography ==
- Holder, Noddy; Verrico, Lisa (1999). Noddy Holder: Who's Crazee Now? My Autobiography. Random House. ISBN 0-09187-075-5.
- Holder, Noddy (2014). The World According to Noddy: Life Lessons Learned In and Out of Rock & Roll. Little Brown Book Group Ltd. ISBN 978-1-47211-564-5.
