= Get Yer Boots On: The Best of Slade =

Compilation album by Slade
- Released: 23 March 2004
- Genre: Rock
- Length: 60:28
- Label: Shout! Factory
- Producer: Chas Chandler (tracks 1-14); John Punter (tracks 15-16)

Slade chronology
Feel the Noize – Greatest Hits (1997)	Get Yer Boots On: The Best of Slade (2004)	The Very Best of Slade (2005)

Get Yer Boots On: The Best of Slade is a compilation album by the British rock band Slade, released in America only by Shout! Factory in March 2004. It was the first Slade compilation to be released in America since 1973's Sladest and was followed by the Shout! Factory compilation In for a Penny: Raves & Faves in 2007. The compilation features sixteen tracks, covering the band's commercial heyday from 1971 to 1975, and their American commercial breakthrough in 1984 with "Run Runaway" and "My Oh My".

== Track listing ==
All tracks are written by Noddy Holder and Jim Lea except "Get Down and Get with It" by Bobby Marchan, and "Look Wot You Dun" by Holder, Lea and Don Powell.

No.	Title	Length
1.	"Get Down and Get with It"	3:49
2.	"Coz I Luv You"	3:25
3.	"Look Wot You Dun"	2:57
4.	"Take Me Bak 'Ome"	3:15
5.	"Mama Weer All Crazee Now"	3:44
6.	"Gudbuy T'Jane"	3:32
7.	"Cum On Feel the Noize"	4:24
8.	"Skweeze Me, Pleeze Me"	4:49
9.	"My Friend Stan"	2:41
10.	"Merry Xmas Everybody"	3:27
11.	"Everyday"	3:10
12.	"The Bangin' Man"	4:11
13.	"Far Far Away"	3:37
14.	"How Does It Feel"	5:53
15.	"Run Runaway"	3:45
16.	"My Oh My"	4:09

== Critical reception ==
Professional ratings
Review scores
Source	Rating
AllMusic	4.5/5 stars

Stephen Thomas Erlewine of AllMusic commented: "A terrific rock & roll record, full of big, dumb riffs, anthemic singalong choruses, and songs that are impossible to get out of your head. Because Slade's music was so deliberately dumb, they tend to be either forgotten or dismissed, but Get Yer Boots On proves they made some of the most addictive, tuneful hard rock of the '70s - it's blue-collar glitter, as primal as AC/DC and catchy as bubblegum pop. Anybody who loves loud guitars and humongous hooks will find this irresistible, and this long-overdue U.S. compilation is the best place to discover how great this band really was."

== Personnel ==
Slade

- Noddy Holder – lead vocals, rhythm guitar
- Dave Hill – lead guitar, backing vocals
- Jim Lea – bass, piano, violin, keyboards, backing vocals
- Don Powell – drums

Additional personnel

- Chas Chandler – producer (tracks 1–14)
- John Punter – producer (tracks 15–16)
- Shawn Amos – A&R direction
- John Roberts – artwork, package supervision
- Dan Epstein – compilation producer, liner notes
- Bryan Lasley, David Gorman – package design for HackMart
- Julee Stover, Tina Reynolds – project assistance
- Dezo Hoffmann, Gered Mankowitz, MichaelOchsArchives.com – photography
