= Feel the Noize – Greatest Hits =

Feel The Noize – Greatest Hits

Compilation album by Slade
- Released: 13 January 1997
- Genre: Glam rock, hard rock
- Length: 79:22
- Label: Polydor
- Producer: Chas Chandler

Slade chronology
The Genesis of Slade (1996)	Feel The Noize – Greatest Hits (1997)	Get Yer Boots On: The Best of Slade (2004)

Feel The Noize – Greatest Hits is a compilation album by the British rock band Slade. It was released in January 1997 and reached No. 19 in the UK charts, remaining in the charts for six weeks. The success of the compilation encouraged other bands of the Glam Rock era to release their own 'Greatest Hits' packages. At the time, a resurgence in Seventies music was happening, due to the constant mentions from Blur's Damon Albarn and Oasis's Noel Gallagher.

== Track listing ==
All tracks are written by Noddy Holder and Jim Lea except "Get Down and Get with It" by Bobby Marchan, "Look Wot You Dun" by Holder, Lea and Don Powell, and "Radio Wall of Sound" by Lea

No.	Title	Length
1.	"Get Down and Get with It"	3:49
2.	"Coz I Luv You"	3:24
3.	"Look Wot You Dun"	2:53
4.	"Take Me Bak 'Ome"	3:12
5.	"Mama Weer All Crazee Now"	3:44
6.	"Gudbuy T'Jane"	3:31
7.	"Cum On Feel the Noize"	4:30
8.	"Skweeze Me, Pleeze Me"	4:28
9.	"My Friend Stan"	2:40
10.	"Everyday"	3:10
11.	"The Bangin' Man"	4:09
12.	"Far Far Away"	3:35
13.	"How Does It Feel"	5:53
14.	"In for a Penny"	3:35
15.	"We'll Bring the House Down"	3:33
16.	"Lock Up Your Daughters"	3:32
17.	"My Oh My"	4:12
18.	"Run Runaway"	3:43
19.	"All Join Hands"	4:15
20.	"Radio Wall of Sound"	3:46
21.	"Merry Xmas Everybody"	3:25

== Critical reception ==
Professional ratings
Review scores
Source	Rating
AllMusic	4.5/5 stars
New Musical Express	9/10 stars

Stephen Thomas Erlewine of AllMusic wrote: "A fine collection including many tracks from Slade's hitmaking heyday, Feel the Noize: Greatest Hits stretches from the group's hit singles of the early '70s beginning with 1971's "Get Down and Get with It" all the way to 1991's "Radio Wall of Sound." In between those two songs is a selection of the group's big, dumb, irresistible, and misspelled hits. It also features latter-day hits like "My Oh My," but Slade never got better than they did at their stomping glitter-rock peak, and Feel the Noize captures the essence of that era."

== Chart performance ==
Chart (1997)	Peak position
UK Albums Chart	19

Chart (1999)	Peak position
UK Albums Chart	158

Chart (2000)	Peak position
UK Albums Chart	115

Chart (2001)	Peak position
UK Albums Chart	180

Chart (2002)	Peak position
Norwegian Albums Chart	10

Chart (2005)	Peak position
UK Albums Chart	192

== Personnel ==
Slade

- Noddy Holder – lead vocals, rhythm guitar, producer (tracks 15–16)
- Dave Hill – lead guitar, backing vocals, producer (tracks 15–16)
- Jim Lea – bass, piano, violin, keyboards, backing vocals, producer (tracks 15–16, 20)
- Don Powell – drums, producer (tracks 15–16)

Additional personnel

- Chas Chandler – producer (tracks 1–14, 21)
- John Punter – producer (tracks 17–19)
