= Slades Greats =

Compilation album by Slade
- Released: 25 May 1984
- Genre: Glam rock; hard rock
- Label: Polydor
- Producer: Chas Chandler

Slade chronology
Keep Your Hands Off My Power Supply (1984)	Slades Greats (1984)	Rogues Gallery (1985)

Slades Greats is a compilation album by the British rock band Slade. It was released by Polydor on 25 May 1984 and reached No. 89 in the UK charts. The compilation, a revised re-issue of the 1980 compilation Slade Smashes!, was released following the band's late 1983-early 1984 success with the singles "My Oh My" and "Run Runaway".

Slades Greats contains sixteen tracks, all of which were hit singles from the 1970s. The track-listing is the same as on Slade Smashes! but with the exclusion of four songs; "Gypsy Roadhog", "In for a Penny", "Give Us a Goal" and "My Baby Left Me/That's Alright Mama".

== Background ==
In November 1980, the band's former label Polydor released Slade Smashes in the wake of new interest in the band following their performance at the 1980 Reading Festival. The album was a success in the UK, reaching No. 21 and gaining a Gold certification in December for selling 200,000 copies. Later in December 1983, the band reached No. 2 with their single "My Oh My" and No. 7 with "Run Runaway" in February 1984. The success of these two singles prompted Polydor to re-issue a revised version of Slade Smashes!, re-titled Slades Greats. Released in May 1984, the compilation, issued on vinyl and cassette, was released in the UK, across Europe and beyond, including New Zealand, Mexico and Canada. It reached No. 89 in the UK.

== Track listing ==
All tracks are written by Noddy Holder and Jim Lea except "Get Down Get With It" by Bobby Marchan and Look Wot You Dun by Noddy Holder, Jim Lea and Don Powell.

Side one
No.	Title	Length
1.	"Cum on Feel the Noize"	4:25
2.	"My Friend Stan"	2:38
3.	"Far Far Away"	3:34
4.	"Coz I Luv You"	3:31
5.	"Everyday"	3:07
6.	"Thanks for the Memory (Wham Bam Thank You Mam)"	4:32
7.	"Bangin' Man"	4:09
8.	"Skweeze Me Pleeze Me"	4:34

Side two
No.	Title	Length
1.	"Mama Weer All Crazee Now"	3:41
2.	"Look Wot You Dun"	2:54
3.	"Take Me Bak 'Ome"	3:12
4.	"Let's Call It Quits"	3:30
5.	"Merry Xmas Everybody"	3:42
6.	"How Does It Feel?"	5:53
7.	"Get Down Get With It"	3:50
8.	"Gudbuy T'Jane"	3:30

== Critical reception ==
Professional ratings
Review scores
Source	Rating
Sounds	5/5 stars
The Virgin Encyclopedia of 70s Music	3/4 stars

Upon release, Sounds said: "For many moons, Slade were the ultimate in down-to-earth rock 'n' roll knees-ups, and to my mind (and there are few finer), their definitely boisterous brand of Big Grin pop-with-balls has never been bettered, nor ear drums so merrily battered. So any album spanning 16 Slade smashes has gotta be a trusty must, right? Well yes, except the last time I reviewed this album was four years ago when it was called Slade Smashes! and came with exactly the same tracks in exactly the same running order only with an extra two songs on each side. In other words, Polydor are trying to wring a few bob out of their back catalogue now the noise boys have moved on to labels and chart successes new. So long-standing Slade slaves should fink before you buy. This is an album of more use to entirely new fans who've got a lot of catching up to do. You lucky sods."

== Personnel ==
Slade

- Noddy Holder – lead vocals, rhythm guitar
- Dave Hill – lead guitar, backing vocals
- Jim Lea – bass, piano, violin, backing vocals
- Don Powell – drums

Additional personnel

- Chas Chandler – producer

== Charts ==
Chart (1984)	Peak position
Australian Albums (Kent Music Report)	70
UK Albums (OCC)	89
UK Heavy Metal Albums (MRIB)	20
