= The Very Best of Slade =

Greatest hits album by Slade
- Released: 28 November 2005
- Recorded: 1971–1991
- Genre: Glam rock; hard rock
- Length: 126:55
- Label: Polydor

Slade chronology
Get Yer Boots On: The Best of Slade (2004)	The Very Best of Slade (2005)	Slade Alive! – The Live Anthology (2006)

The Very Best of Slade is a compilation album by the British rock band Slade. It was released in 2005 and reached No. 39 in the UK charts, remaining in the charts for four weeks. The album has sold 139,390 copies as of November 2015.

A DVD of the same name was also released at the same time. It features the same material that had appeared on the 1991 VHS compilation Wall of Hits. In addition, the band's 1972 Set of Six for Granada TV is included, alongside an additional number of other clips.

== Critical reception ==
Professional ratings
Review scores
Source	Rating
AllMusic	4.5/5 stars

Dave Thompson of AllMusic commented: "The Very Best of... Slade effectively renders every past Slade hits collection redundant, as remastered sound and a sharp eye for all the band's U.K. chart entries serve up a peerless examination of what remains one of British rock's most flawless careers. No matter that the hits went so badly off the boil around 1975-1976 - still, three-quarters of disc one is nonstop solid gold and the remainder of the set isn't far behind, as Slade's mid-'80s renaissance delivers further smashes "My Oh My" and "Run Run Away." Which would be hits enough for anybody, but the fun doesn't end there. A bonus second disc then digs into the darker recesses of the Top 75 to pull out the band's lesser successes. It's not a complete guide to Slade on 45, but it comes close enough."

== Track listing ==
=== Disc one ===
All tracks are written by Noddy Holder and Jim Lea except "Get Down and Get with It" by Bobby Marchan and "Look Wot You Dun" by Holder, Lea and Don Powell

The Very Best of Slade disc one track listing
No.	Title	Length
1.	"Get Down and Get with It"	3:51
2.	"Coz I Luv You"	3:26
3.	"Look Wot You Dun"	2:58
4.	"Take Me Bak 'Ome"	3:16
5.	"Mama Weer All Crazee Now"	3:45
6.	"Gudbuy T'Jane"	3:33
7.	"Cum On Feel the Noize"	4:25
8.	"Skweeze Me, Pleeze Me"	4:30
9.	"My Friend Stan"	2:42
10.	"Everyday"	3:11
11.	"The Bangin' Man"	4:11
12.	"Far Far Away"	3:57
13.	"How Does It Feel"	5:54
14.	"Thanks for the Memory (Wham Bam Thank You Mam)"	4:34
15.	"In for a Penny"	3:35
16.	"Let's Call It Quits"	3:32
17.	"We'll Bring the House Down"	3:34
18.	"My Oh My"	4:11
19.	"Run Runaway"	3:45
20.	"Merry Xmas Everybody"	3:28

=== Disc two ===
All tracks are written by Noddy Holder and Jim Lea except "My Baby Left Me" by Arthur Crudup and "Born to Be Wild" by Mars Bonfire

The Very Best of Slade disc two track listing
No.	Title	Length
1.	"All Join Hands"	4:16
2.	"Gypsy Roadhog"	3:23
3.	"My Baby Left Me – That's All Right"	2:24
4.	"Lock Up Your Daughters"	3:30
5.	"Wheels Ain't Coming Down"	3:40
6.	"Born to Be Wild (Live)"	3:13
7.	"Ruby Red"	2:52
8.	"(And Now the Waltz) C'est La Vie"	3:47
9.	"7 Year Bitch"	3:59
10.	"Myzsterious Mizster Jones"	3:37
11.	"Do You Believe in Miracles"	4:11
12.	"Still the Same"	3:54
13.	"Radio Wall of Sound"	3:46
14.	"Universe"	4:13

== Personnel ==
Slade

- Noddy Holder – lead vocals, rhythm guitar
- Dave Hill – lead guitar, backing vocals
- Jim Lea – bass, piano, violin, keyboards, backing vocals
- Don Powell – drums

== Charts ==
=== Weekly charts ===
Weekly chart performance for The Very Best of Slade
Chart (2005)	Peak position
Scottish Albums (OCC)	52
UK Albums (OCC)	39

=== Year-end charts ===
Year-end chart performance for The Very Best of Slade
Chart (2005)	Position
UK Albums (OCC)	187
