= Slam the Hammer Down =

Single by Slade

from the album The Amazing Kamikaze Syndrome & Keep Your Hands Off My Power Supply
- B-side: "Slam the Hammer Down (Hotter)"
- Released: 1984
- Genre: Hard rock
- Length: 2:50
- Label: CBS
- Songwriters: Noddy Holder, Jim Lea
- Producer: Jim Lea

Slade singles chronology
"Run Runaway" (1984)	"Slam the Hammer Down" (1984)	"All Join Hands" (1984)

Audio sample
- file; help

"Slam the Hammer Down" is a song by the British rock band Slade, released in 1984 as a promotional-only single from the band's American studio album Keep Your Hands Off My Power Supply. It was written by lead vocalist Noddy Holder and bassist Jim Lea, and produced by Lea.

== Background ==
The 1983 success of Quiet Riot's version of Slade's 1973 UK chart topper "Cum On Feel the Noize" led to Slade signing with CBS for their first American record deal since the 1970s. The label soon repackaged the band's 1983 album The Amazing Kamikaze Syndrome into Keep Your Hands Off My Power Supply. "Run Runaway" successfully broke the band in America, while "My Oh My" also reached the Top 40. Keep Your Hands Off My Power Supply, released in April, reached No. 33. During 1984, "Slam the Hammer Down" was also released as a promotional-only 12" vinyl single by CBS. For the release, Shep Pettibone was commissioned to remix the song into two versions: "Hot" on the A-side and "Hotter" on the B-side.

"Slam the Hammer Down" opens with a shouted soliloquy by Holder from a helicopter. Speaking of the song's lyrics in a 1984 fan club interview, Holder said: "Another motor-racing theme - translate the double meaning at your leisure." The band performed the song at the 1984 Montreux Festival.

== Critical reception ==
In a review of The Amazing Kamikaze Syndrome, Record Mirror described the song as a "meaty great splodge of gut gurgling notes and Holder's voice freshly rubbed down with 00 gauge wire wool". Jerry Harris of Sounds highlighted "Slam the Hammer Down" as one of his favourite tracks from the album. He described it as "classic Slade party material". Kerrang! noted Holder's "formidable voice" on the song, adding that the track was a "raucous, rollicking and simply addictive little riot that kicks the album off with a resounding start".

In a review of Keep Your Hands Off My Power Supply, Chicago Tribune said the song "should satisfy even the most demanding metal-head". In a retrospective review of the album, Joe Geesin of Get Ready to Rock! said "The riffs were still big, and the solos were if anything better, more metal, if commercial metal (check out opener "Slam the Hammer Down")."

== Track listing ==
12" Single

1. "Slam The Hammer Down (Hot)" - 2:50
2. "Slam The Hammer Down (Hotter)" - 3:50

== Personnel ==
Slade

- Noddy Holder - lead vocals, rhythm guitar
- Dave Hill - lead guitar, backing vocals
- Jim Lea - bass, backing vocals, producer
- Don Powell - drums

=== Additional credits ===
- Shep Pettibone - remixes
