= Keep Your Hands Off My Power Supply =

Studio album by Slade
- Released: March 1984
- Genres: Hard rock, pop rock
- Length: 39:21
- Label: CBS Associated
- Producers: Jim Lea, John Punter

Slade chronology
The Amazing Kamikaze Syndrome (1983)	Keep Your Hands Off My Power Supply (1984)	Slade's Greats (1984)

Singles from Keep Your Hands Off My Power Supply
- 1. "Run Runaway" Released: March 1984; 2. "My Oh My" Released: June 1984; 3. "Slam the Hammer Down" Released: 1984

Keep Your Hands Off My Power Supply is a studio album by the British rock group Slade, released in America and Canada on 2 April 1984. It is a repackaged version of The Amazing Kamikaze Syndrome which was released in the UK, Europe and across the rest of the world in December 1983. Keep Your Hands Off My Power Supply reached No. 33 in the US and No. 26 in Canada, giving the band their breakthrough in the US. The album proved to be the most successful North American release of Slade's career. Both "Run Runaway" and "My Oh My" enjoyed Top 40 success as singles there.

In August 1984, the album was certified Gold in Canada for 50,000 sales.

== Background ==
The 1983 success of Quiet Riot's version of Slade's 1973 UK chart topper "Cum On Feel the Noize" led to Slade signing with CBS for their first American record deal since the 1970s. The label soon repackaged the band's recently released album, The Amazing Kamikaze Syndrome, into Keep Your Hands Off My Power Supply. The Amazing Kamikaze Syndrome, along with its singles "My Oh My" and "Run Runaway", had already achieved success in the UK and Europe. Keep Your Hands Off My Power Supply featured a different track-order. It also replaced "Cocky Rock Boys (Rule O.K.)" and "Razzle Dazzle Man" with the 1983 "My Oh My" B-Sides "Keep Your Hands Off My Power Supply" and "Can't Tame a Hurricane".

"Run Runaway" was released first in America in March 1984. The song's music video received heavy rotation on MTV, and "Run Runaway" went on to reach No. 20 on the Billboard Hot 100 and No. 1 on the Rock Tracks chart. The album, Keep Your Hands Off My Power Supply, was released in April, reaching No. 33 on the Billboard 200. "My Oh My" was released as the second single in June and reached No. 37 on the Billboard Hot 100. "Slam the Hammer Down" was later released as a promotional-only single, featuring a "Hot" and "Hotter" remix by Shep Pettibone.

The band's new-found success in America saw them set out to do a full American tour supporting Ozzy Osbourne. For their American activities, Slade were managed by Sharon Osbourne. Prior to the tour, the band played a few warm-up shows. However, on the first night of the tour with Osbourne, Slade had to cancel the remainder of the shows when bassist Jim Lea collapsed after the first gig and was diagnosed with hepatitis. Coinciding with the breakdown of lead vocalist Noddy Holder's marriage, the band agreed to stop touring to allow Holder a break. This was the final time the band would tour together, although the band continued recording and releasing new material.

== Track listing ==
All tracks are written by Noddy Holder and Jim Lea.

Side one
No.	Title	Length
1.	"Run Runaway"	5:01
2.	"My Oh My"	4:12
3.	"High and Dry"	3:13
4.	"Slam the Hammer Down"	3:24
5.	"In the Doghouse"	2:47

Side two
No.	Title	Length
6.	"Keep Your Hands Off My Power Supply"	3:33
7.	"Cheap 'n' Nasty Luv"	2:42
8.	"Can't Tame a Hurricane"	2:32
9.	"(And Now the Waltz) C'est La Vie"	3:42
10.	"Ready to Explode"	8:11

== Song information ==
"Keep Your Hands Off My Power Supply" is about a drunk driver with an "amorous female" as passenger being followed by the police. "(And Now the Waltz) C'est La Vie" was originally released as a single in November 1982, where it reached No. 50 in the UK. "Ready to Explode" is an eight-and-half-minute, multi-themed song about the excitement of motor racing.

== Critical reception ==
Professional ratings
Review scores
Source	Rating
AllMusic	4/5 stars
Chicago Tribune	favorable
The Chilliwack Progress	mixed
Daily Record (Morristown)	favorable
Detroit Free Press	favorable
The Odessa American	favorable
The Pittsburgh Press	favorable
Philadelphia Daily News	3/5 stars
Springfield Leader & Press	favorable

Upon release, Chicago Tribune noted Slade's "sledgehammer style" being similar to the "intensity of metal attacks", but with an approach "more melodic". They summarised: "It's all loud, aggressive music, and new Slade numbers such as "Slam the Hammer Down" should satisfy even the most demanding metal-head." Daily Record of Morristown highlighted Holder's "sandpaper rasp", adding he sounded "pleasantly abrasive". The review concluded: "Their tunefulness and their humor make them a wonderful alternative to such grim successors as Judas Priest, or even the colorless Quiet Riot." Philadelphia Daily News felt the album did not contain anything "quite so inspired and grungy" as "Mama Weer All Crazee Now", but added: "fans of light heavy metal and Joan Jett's style of headbashing will find this batch of grunge very much to their liking."

Springfield Leader & Press described the album as containing "pretty simple rockers" and "piledriving rock 'n' roll", with a "goofy sense of fun", "memorable chorus[es]" and "lots of guitar". They concluded: "If Quiet Riot can score hits, then there is no reason why Slade can't." The Odessa American wrote: "Half of this album is negligible, but 10 years after Slayed?, this veteran troupe still delivers non-bombastic rock melodies, charming ballads and of course, misspelled song titles." The Pittsburgh Press described the album as "powerful" but not "mindless", adding that the album "could win Slade the American audience they couldn't wrest from Deep Purple, Led Zeppelin and Uriah Heep more than a decade ago."

In a retrospective review, Stephen Thomas Erlewine of AllMusic summarised the album as showing that Slade "are still the masters of loud, trashy hard rock." Jeff Giles of Ultimate Classic Rock said the album was the "right album at the right time – a well-written and smartly polished set of songs that topped off the band's rock sound with pop production perfectly in step with current trends."

== Personnel ==
Slade

- Noddy Holder – lead vocals, rhythm guitar
- Dave Hill – lead guitar, backing vocals
- Jim Lea – bass, keyboards, guitars, backing vocals, lead vocal on verses (track 10), producer
- Don Powell – drums, percussion, gongs

Additional personnel

- Andy Dummit – saxophone (track 5)
- Pete Drummond – announcements (track 10)
- John Punter – producer (tracks 1–2)
- Andy Miller, Dave Garland – engineers (tracks 3–10)
- Mike Nocito, Pete Schwier – engineers (tracks 1–2)
- Lou Brooks – artwork (illustration)
- Jo Di Donato – cover design

== Charts ==
Chart (1984)	Peak position
Canada Top Albums/CDs (RPM)	26
US Billboard 200	33
US Billboard Rock Albums	3
US Cash Box Top 100 Albums	32
US AOR Albums (Radio & Records)	4

== Certifications ==
Region	Certification	Certified units/sales
Canada (Music Canada)	Gold	50,000^{^}
^{^} Shipments figures based on certification alone.
