= Slade =

English rock band

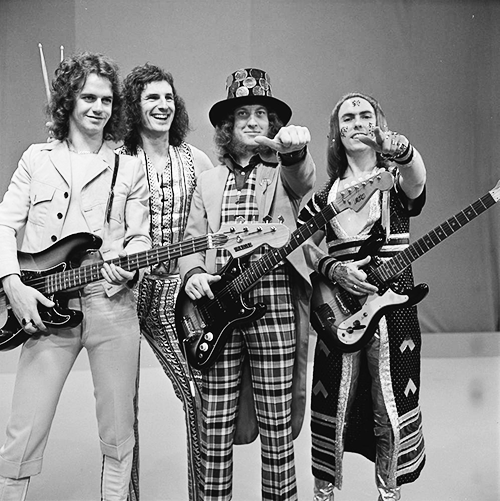
- Classic lineup of Slade in November 1973; left to right: Jim Lea, Don Powell, Noddy Holder, Dave Hill

Background information
- Also known as: The Vendors (1963–1964); The N'Betweens (1964–1969); Ambrose Slade (1969); The Slade (1969–1970); Slade II (1992–2002); Dave Hill's Slade (2025–present)
- Origin: Wolverhampton, Staffordshire, England
- Genres: Glam rock; hard rock
- Years active: 1963–present
- Labels: Fontana; Polydor; Cotillion; RCA; CBS; Cheapskate; Barn
- Members: Dave Hill; John Berry; Russell Keefe; Alex Bines
- Past members: John Howells; Mick Marson; Bill Diffey; Cass Jones; Noddy Holder; Jim Lea; Don Powell; Steve Whalley; Steve Makin; Trevor Holliday; Dave Glover; Craig Fenney; Mal McNulty
- Website: https://www.davehillslade.com/

Slade (now known as Dave Hill's Slade) are an English rock band formed in Wolverhampton in 1963. They rose to prominence during the glam rock era in the early 1970s, achieving 17 consecutive top 20 hits, including six number ones, on the UK Singles Chart, and three number ones on the UK Albums Charts. The British Hit Singles & Albums names them the most successful British group of the 1970s based on sales of singles. They were the first act to have three singles enter the charts at number one; all six of the band's chart-toppers were written by Noddy Holder and Jim Lea. As of 2006, total UK sales stood at over 6,500,000. Their best-selling single, "Merry Xmas Everybody", has sold in excess of one million copies. According to the 1999 BBC documentary It's Slade, the band have sold more than 50 million records worldwide.

All four members of Slade grew up in the area of England known as the Black Country. After a period in different groups, the four members came together by 1966 as 'N Betweens, and recorded some unsuccessful singles. In 1969 Jack Baverstock of Philips Records signed them and recorded their debut album, changing their name to "Ambrose Slade", a name inspired by Baverstock's secretary, who had named her handbag Ambrose and her shoes Slade. Slade dominated the UK singles charts during the early 1970s. Slade achieved twelve Top 5 hit singles in the UK between 1971 and 1974, three of which went straight to No. 1. Of the 17 Top 20 hits between 1971 and 1976, six made No. 1, three reached No. 2 and two peaked at No. 3. No other UK act of the period enjoyed such consistently high chart placings in the UK Top 40 or sold as many singles. In 1973 alone, "Merry Xmas Everybody" sold over one million copies globally, obtaining gold disc status. They toured Europe in 1973 and the US in 1974. Slade have released over 30 albums, three of which reached No. 1 in the UK Albums Chart. Their releases have spent 315 weeks in the UK charts and they have earned 24 top-30 UK hits as of 2016.

Following an unsuccessful move to the U.S. in 1975, Slade's popularity in the UK waned, but was unexpectedly revived in 1980 when they were last-minute replacements for Ozzy Osbourne at the Reading Rock Festival. The band later acknowledged this to have been one of the highlights of their career. For the next two years, the band produced material tailored towards the heavy-metal scene and by 1984, they finally cracked the American market with the hits "Run Runaway" and "My Oh My". This new-found success did not last long, however, and despite a top-25 UK hit in the early 1990s the band split in 1992. Guitarist Dave Hill and drummer Don Powell re-formed later in the year as Slade II. The band have continued, with a number of line-up changes, to the present day. They shortened the group name back to Slade in 2002 and toured in 2025 and 2026 as Dave Hill's Slade.

A number of artists from diverse genres have cited Slade as an influence. The Illustrated Encyclopaedia of Music tells of Holder's powerful vocals, guitarist Dave Hill's equally arresting dress sense and the deliberate misspelling of their song titles (such as "Cum On Feel the Noize" and "Mama Weer All Crazee Now") for which they became well known.

== Career ==
=== Early years (1963–1970) ===
All the members of Slade grew up in the Black Country. Drummer Don Powell and bassist Jim Lea were born and brought up in Wolverhampton, lead vocalist Noddy Holder was born and brought up in nearby Caldmore in Walsall, and lead guitarist Dave Hill moved to Wolverhampton from Holbeton, Devon as a child.

In 1963, drummer Don Powell and guitarist Dave Hill were part of a Midland-based group called the Vendors with John Howells (vocals) Mick Marson (guitar) and Bill Diffey (bass) (Diffey would be replaced by Dave "Cass" Jones in 1964). Regulars on the club circuit, they had also recorded a privately pressed four-track EP. At the time, Noddy Holder was playing guitar and contributing to vocals in Steve Brett & the Mavericks. Signed to Columbia Records, the band released three singles in 1964. After listening to American blues artists such as Sonny Boy Williamson II, John Lee Hooker and Howlin' Wolf, the Vendors decided on a change of direction and name: As the 'N Betweens they gained greater recognition and began to get supporting gigs with acts such as the Hollies, the Yardbirds, Georgie Fame and the Blue Flames and the Spencer Davis Group.

The Mavericks and the 'N Betweens were on their way to separate gigs in Germany when they met on a ferry in 1965. Powell and Hill asked Holder if he would be interested in joining The 'N Betweens, but Holder declined. Later, back in their home town of Wolverhampton, the musicians met again and this time Holder agreed to join the group. Jim Lea, whose musical background and strong bass guitar skills were considered an asset, had already been recruited. Lea, who also played the piano and violin, had been in the Staffordshire Youth Orchestra and had gained first class honours in a London music-school practical exam. Lea and Holder took over as band members from John Howells (vocals), Mick Marson (guitar) and Cass Jones (bass), who had just left the N' Betweens. Lea had replaced Cass Jones and Holder took on both Howells' and Marson's roles and singer and guitarist.

By 1966, this new version of the 'N Betweens had recorded a promo single of the Otis Redding track "Security" and a self-penned song, "Evil Witchman", released on Highland Records. A further single, "You Better Run" was released on Columbia Records and produced by Kim Fowley. This last single was reported by Powell to have topped the regional Midland chart, although it failed to make any national impact. Between 1966 and 1967, the band's performance centred on the R&B and Tamla Motown styles, while Holder's flair for showmanship began to give the band a focus. During 1967, the band recorded the Honeybus track "Delighted to See You" which remained unreleased until 1994, where it featured on the various artists compilation Psychedelia at Abbey Road. Although the group did not record again for roughly two years, they built up a respectable reputation on the live circuit.

Slade in their skinhead phase in 1969 from left: Powell, Lea, Holder, Hill.

A local promoter, Roger Allen spotted the group in 1969 and alerted the head of A&R at Philips Records, Jack Baverstock. The group spent a week in the Philips Studio at Stanhope Place recording an album, after which Baverstock offered to sign the group to Fontana Records if they changed their name and obtained London-based management. The band were initially hesitant because of the reputation gained as the 'N Betweens, but eventually agreed to "Ambrose Slade", a name inspired by Baverstock's secretary, who had named her handbag Ambrose and her shoes Slade. Baverstock also found the group an agent, John Gunnel, who had previously worked with the entertainment entrepreneur Robert Stigwood.

The band's debut album Beginnings, released in mid-1969, was a commercial failure, as was the instrumental single "Genesis" and the follow-up single "Wild Winds Are Blowing". While the album was being recorded, the band were visited by Gunnel and his business partner, Animals' bassist Chas Chandler. Chandler was impressed with what he heard in the studio, and after seeing the band live the following day, offered to manage them. As Chandler had previous managerial experience with Jimi Hendrix, the band accepted. Chandler was not pleased with the debut album and thought the band would benefit from writing their own material and a change of image. The band adopted a skinhead look as an attempt to gain publicity from what was a newsworthy youth fashion trend, but this also added an unwelcome association with football hooliganism. Noddy Holder and Don Powell were particularly tough-looking individuals already, and the skinhead look exacerbated the disturbing effect of having "toughs" in the band. In 1970, the band shortened their name to Slade and released a new single, a cover of "Shape of Things to Come" which, despite a performance on United Kingdom music show Top of the Pops, failed to chart.

Chandler moved Slade to Polydor Records, believing a higher-profile label would boost sales. Lyrics were added to the instrumental "Genesis" from the band's debut album, the result being released as "Know Who You Are", but again, the single failed to make any impression on the UK chart as did the album Play It Loud, released in late 1970 and produced by Chandler himself. Later the album was retrospectively well received by fans and critics, and earned a silver disc for sales.

=== Glam rock, success and peak (1971–1974) ===
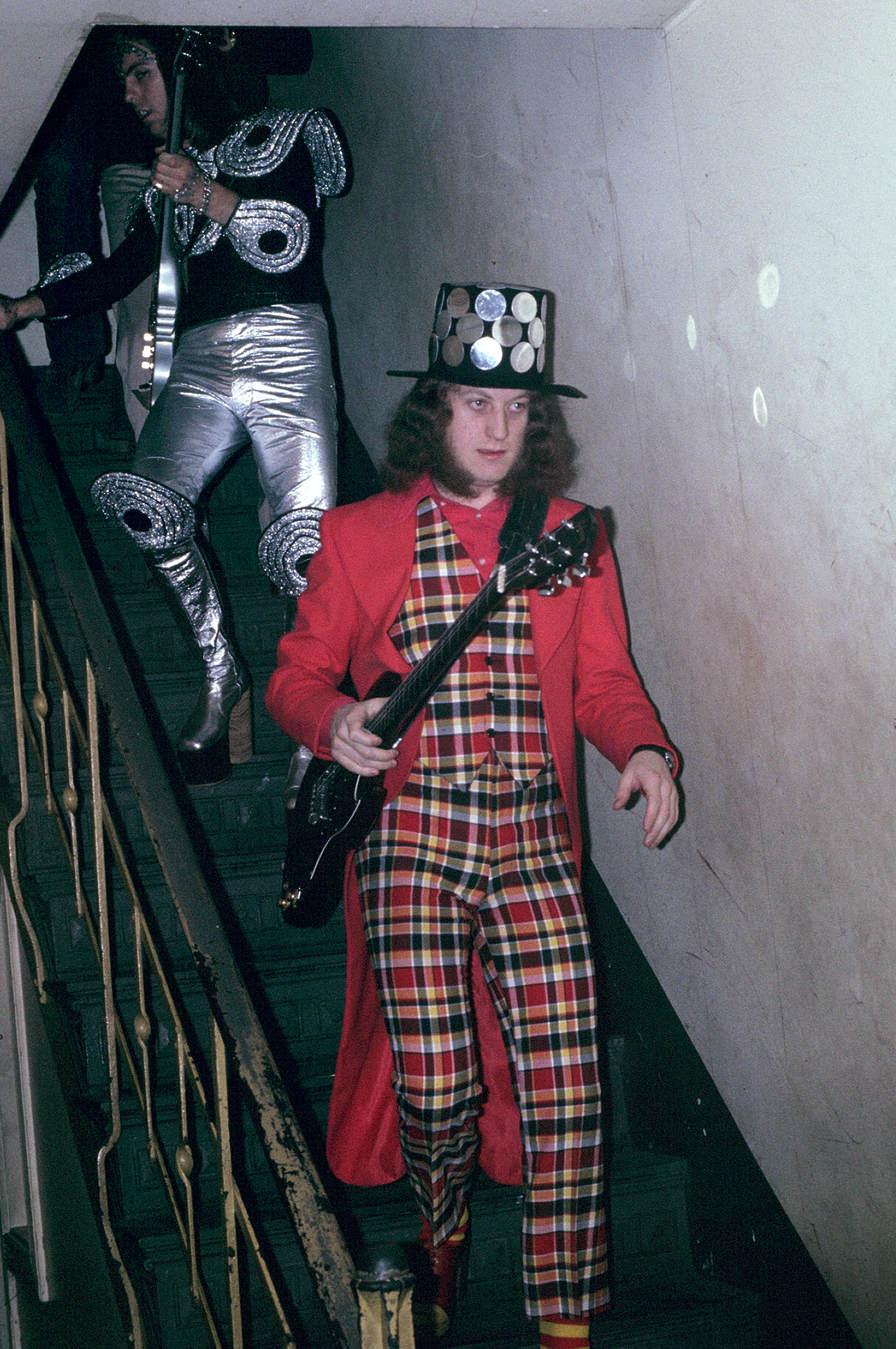
Noddy Holder (right) and Dave Hill (left), near the height of their fame in 1973, showing some of their more extreme glam rock fashions

Chandler had been managing the band for almost two years without success when he suggested releasing a version of the Bobby Marchan song "Get Down and Get With It", originally performed by Little Richard. Slade still enjoyed a good reputation as a live act and the song had been used in their performances for a number of years. Always popular, the song's lyrics demanded audience participation and it was hoped that the feeling of a live gig would be projected into the studio recording. The song was released in mid-1971, and by August it entered the top 20 in the UK chart, peaking at number 16.

The band members grew their hair long and allied themselves to the glam rock movement of the early 1970s. Hill's stage costumes also became notable during this period. Chandler now demanded the band write a follow-up single themselves which led to Lea and Holder writing "Coz I Luv You". The song was written in half an hour and started a writing partnership which would continue throughout Slade's career. Upon hearing the track played to him acoustically, a pleased Chandler predicted the song would make number one. While recording, the band felt the song's sound to be too soft, and so clapping and bootstamping were added. The song's misspelled title also became a trademark for Slade while causing a furore among British school teachers. The attendant appearance on BBC Television's Top of the Pops brought Slade to a wider audience as well as pushing "Coz I Luv You" to number one in the UK Singles Chart. In November 1971, NME reported that Slade had turned down a multimillion-dollar campaign, including a television series and a heavily promoted tour of the US. "But", commented Holder, "acceptance would have meant the cancellation of many commitments here – and the last thing we want to do is to mess around the people who have put us where we are".

A second single entitled "Look Wot You Dun", was released at the start of 1972, peaking at number four and a live album was released in March. The album Slade Alive! proved to be successful, spending 52 weeks in the UK Albums Chart, peaking at number two. It also did well abroad, topping the Australian chart and giving the band their first chart entry in America. The album was recorded over three nights at a newly built studio in Piccadilly in front of 300 fan-club members. Today the album is regarded as one of the finest live albums ever made.

Two months later, the band released "Take Me Bak 'Ome". The single became Slade's second UK number one and charted in a number of other countries, including the United States, where it reached number 97 in the Billboard Hot 100. Slade achieved their third number one when "Mama Weer All Crazee Now" was released later that year.

Released in November 1972, the album Slayed? peaked at number one both in the UK and Australia, where it relegated Slade Alive to the second spot; and reaching number 69 in America. Both Slade Alive! and Slayed? are widely considered to be two of the finest albums of the glam rock era. The final single of 1972, "Gudbuy T' Jane", was released shortly after, peaking at number two in the UK. The single was a big worldwide hit but only managed to reach number 68 in the American Billboard Chart.

In early 1973, "Cum on Feel the Noize" was released and went straight to number one, the first time a single had done so since The Beatles' "Get Back" in 1969. Another worldwide hit for Slade, the single again failed to impress in America where it made number 98. The follow-up single "Skweeze Me, Pleeze Me", again went straight to number one. A car crash in Wolverhampton on 4 July 1973 left Powell in a coma and his 20-year-old girlfriend, Angela Morris, dead. The band's future was left in the balance as Slade refused to continue without their drummer; however, Lea's brother, Frank, covered Powell's position at the Isle of Man Festival to avoid disappointing fans. Powell, who had suffered breaks to both ankles and five ribs, successfully recovered after surgery and was able to rejoin the band ten weeks later in New York, where they recorded "Merry Xmas Everybody" – in the middle of a heatwave. Powell still suffers with acute short-term memory loss and sensory problems as a result of the accident. Whilst Powell was recovering, and in an attempt to keep up momentum, the band released a compilation album Sladest, which topped the UK and Australian charts in the first week of its release. A new single, "My Friend Stan", was also released. It marked a change from previous records, being more piano based and sounding more like a novelty song. During the recording sessions, Powell who was walking with the aid of a stick, had to be lifted up to his drum kit. The single was successful, peaking at number two in the UK and number one in Ireland.

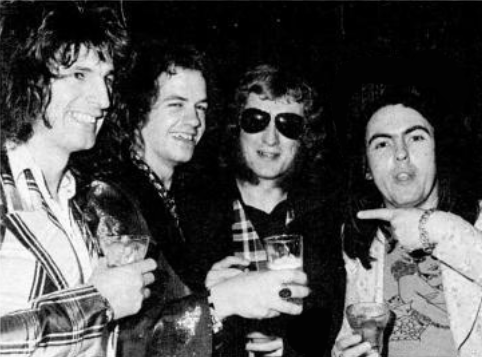
Slade in June 1973

The Christmas-themed song "Merry Xmas Everybody" was Slade's last single of 1973 and became the band's last number one in the UK. Prompted by a challenge from Lea's mother-in-law to write a seasonal song, the chorus was the melody from a discarded song written by Holder six years previously. It became Slade's best-selling single. The song has remained popular and has been released multiple times since, charting on a number of occasions.

The band began to experiment with different musical styles, moving away from their usual successful rock anthems. Following the success of "My Friend Stan", Slade released the album Old, New, Borrowed and Blue, in February 1974 which went to number one in the UK. Re-titled Stomp Your Hands, Clap Your Feet, the album was another disappointment in the US, failing to break into the top 100. The following month saw a new single released. "Everyday" was a piano led ballad which made number three in the UK chart. The next single, "The Bangin' Man" saw a return to a more guitar-based sound, again reaching the number three position.

=== Decline in popularity (1974–1975) ===
In the latter half of 1974, the possibility of making a film was being discussed. The band considered a number of screenplays before settling on Slade in Flame, a gritty tale of the rise and fall of a fictional 1960s group called Flame; the story was based on true music business events involving Slade and various other groups of the time. A track from the film was released, "Far Far Away"; this reached number two in the UK and topped the charts in Norway and other parts of Scandinavia. Holder has cited the single as his favourite Slade song.

The soundtrack album was released in late November and despite a positive reception from the critics, the disappointing chart position of number six was seen by some as an indication of the band's decline in popularity. The film, released in January 1975, received a somewhat mixed reception. Critics loved it, but it was thought that its bleak, noir atmosphere confused Slade fans who were used to Slade delivering a good time. Directed by Richard Loncraine and written by Andrew Birkin, the film featured Tom Conti in his first major film role.

The number 15 position of the film's main theme song, "How Does It Feel", was seen as further proof of the band's decline. The ballad, featuring brass instruments and flute, was at the time thought to be too far from the fans' expectations. Noel Gallagher of the British band Oasis however has claimed the track to be, "one of the best songs written, in the history of pop, ever". The follow-up in May "Thanks for the Memory (Wham Bam Thank You Mam)" fared slightly better, peaking at number seven in the UK and doing well in a number of other European countries. The single became Slade's last top 10 hit of the 1970s.

=== Stateside (1975–1977) ===
By mid-1975, the band had become disillusioned with their lack of success in America. Feeling that they were becoming stale and had achieved all they could in Europe, Slade decided to a make a permanent move to the States and try to build a solid reputation from live performances; just as they had previously done in the UK. According to the Slade Fan Club newsletter of August and September 1975, the band took twelve tons of equipment, worth approximately £45,000 at the time. Throughout the remainder of 1975 and 1976, Slade toured the US, often with other bands such as Aerosmith, ZZ Top and Black Sabbath, only returning to the UK for TV performances of new singles.

Between tours, Holder and Lea began writing for a new album which was heavily influenced by the US and aimed at an American audience. The group booked themselves into New York's Record Plant Studios in mid-1975 to record the album Nobody's Fools. Featuring backing vocals from Tasha Thomas, it contained elements of soul, country and funk music. The first two singles from the new album, "In For a Penny" and "Let's Call It Quits" were released in November 1975 and January 1976 respectively, both made number 11 in the UK chart although the latter made no impression outside of the UK. The album, released in March 1976, failed to make any impact in America and was also a disappointment in the UK where it peaked at number 14 and dropped out of the chart completely after four weeks. The final track from the album was the title track "Nobody's Fool". Released in April, it failed to chart at all, the first to do so since the band's rise to fame in 1971. Fans within the UK accused the band of 'selling out' and forgetting about their fan base at home.

=== Wilderness years (1977–1980) ===
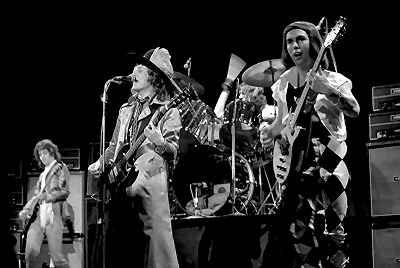
Slade performing in Oslo in 1977

Overall, Slade's American venture was seen as a failure, although the band felt improved and rejuvenated. The live success in cities such as St. Louis, Philadelphia, and New York was not translated into US airplay, however, and the band returned to the UK at the beginning of 1977 to find that punk rock was the new popular style of rock and that they were largely forgotten and out of fashion. Chandler decided not to renew the band's contract with Polydor Records, instead signing them to his own record label, Barn Records.

The band's first release with Barn Records was the single "Gypsy Roadhog", in January 1977. The track was performed on the children's show Blue Peter, but complaints arose due to supposed drug references and the record was subsequently banned by the BBC. This in turn led to the single's stalling at number 48 in the UK chart. The title of the subsequent album was taken from a piece of graffiti seen in London, and made reference to the band's current position in the public eye: Whatever Happened to Slade was released in March and failed to make any chart appearance in the UK. Chandler was reportedly disappointed in the material that Holder and Lea were writing, claiming that the album was not commercial enough, but despite its lack of mainstream success, the album was met with critical praise and support from the English punk movement of the time. Since their return to the UK, the band continued to tour but mainly in smaller venues such as universities and clubs.

"Burning in the Heat of Love", released a month later, also failed to chart. In October, the band released an amalgamation of two Arthur Crudup songs, entitled "My Baby Left Me/ That's All Right" as a tribute to the recent death of Elvis Presley. The single proved to be a moderate success, peaking at number 32 in the UK. Slade was unable to keep momentum for the next single, "Give Us a Goal", released in March 1978. Based on English football chants, it was intended to appeal to fans of the sport but failed to make any impact, other than making the airplay-based charts of Radio Luxembourg and Manchester's Piccadilly Radio. It has however been used in successful advertising campaigns in recent years.

In August 1978, Holder was reportedly involved in a backstage altercation with a bouncer (Desmond Brothers) at The Stoneleigh Club in Porthcawl, South Wales. The bouncer was later sentenced to three months' imprisonment for instigating the attack, which occurred after Holder asked club staff to stop pushing audience members who had been pressed against the stage during the performance. Holder performed the following night as scheduled at a club in Cleethorpes, Lincolnshire, despite having sustained a broken nose. The incident was later referenced in the 1981 single "Knuckle Sandwich Nancy", which Holder insisted be released as a single. The band stated in contemporary interviews that RCA and Chas Chandler objected to its release, resulting in it being issued on the Cheapskate label rather than on RCA, the label to which they were contracted.

In late 1978, the band released "Rock 'n' Roll Bolero", which was another commercial failure. As the band were still a respected live act, and because the 1972 album Slade Alive! had been so successful, the group decided to release another live album. Slade Alive, Vol. 2 consisted of performances recorded during the 1976 Autumn tour of America and the 1977 Spring tour of the UK.

In 1979, the band released a further three singles: "Ginny, Ginny", "Sign of the Times" and a cover of the party track "Okey Cokey". All failed to chart. The Slade newsletter of the time announced that "Ginny, Ginny" had made the top 200 in the UK but not the official top 100. In October 1979, the band released a new studio album Return to Base, the first album not to have Chandler as producer. Disagreements between Lea and Chandler, centring on business problems and Lea's desire to produce Slade's material, had been brewing since the recording of Whatever Happened to Slade in 1977. Lea in particular disagreed with Chandler on production decisions. As a result, Chandler offered to sever his association with the band. Slade, not wishing to be rid of Chandler entirely, asked him to stay on for the time being as their manager, which Chandler agreed to do. The album was a failure in the UK but the following year it topped both the Telemoustique chart and the official album chart in Belgium. Released exclusively in Belgium, the album's version of Chuck Berry's "I'm a Rocker" also made number 1.

Slade's failures and lack of airplay led Lea to wonder if their material would be better received if recorded by another band. In late 1979, Lea formed The Dummies as a side project, with his brother Frank. They released three singles, which received plenty of radio airplay but sales suffered from distribution problems. In February 1980, Holder was briefly considered as a replacement for Bon Scott, the recently deceased singer of AC/DC. Holder was said to have turned the position down, despite Slade's current situation, because of his loyalty to the band. In mid-1980, Slade released their first extended play titled "Six of the Best" which featured three tracks from the Return to Base album and three brand new rock tracks. Even though it was being sold for a lower than usual price of £1.49, it still failed to sell enough to make a chart appearance. As a result, the band stopped working together and Hill started driving couples to their weddings in his own Rolls-Royce, to earn money. The business never really took off, as Hill only drove one couple (a pair of fans).

Hill later recalled that during this period Slade "played the difficult gigs, the gigs where people have chicken in a basket and then go on the dancefloor" but noted that they "had an armour of fantastic songs so nobody was going to argue with [them]."

=== Comeback and heavy metal following (1980–1982) ===
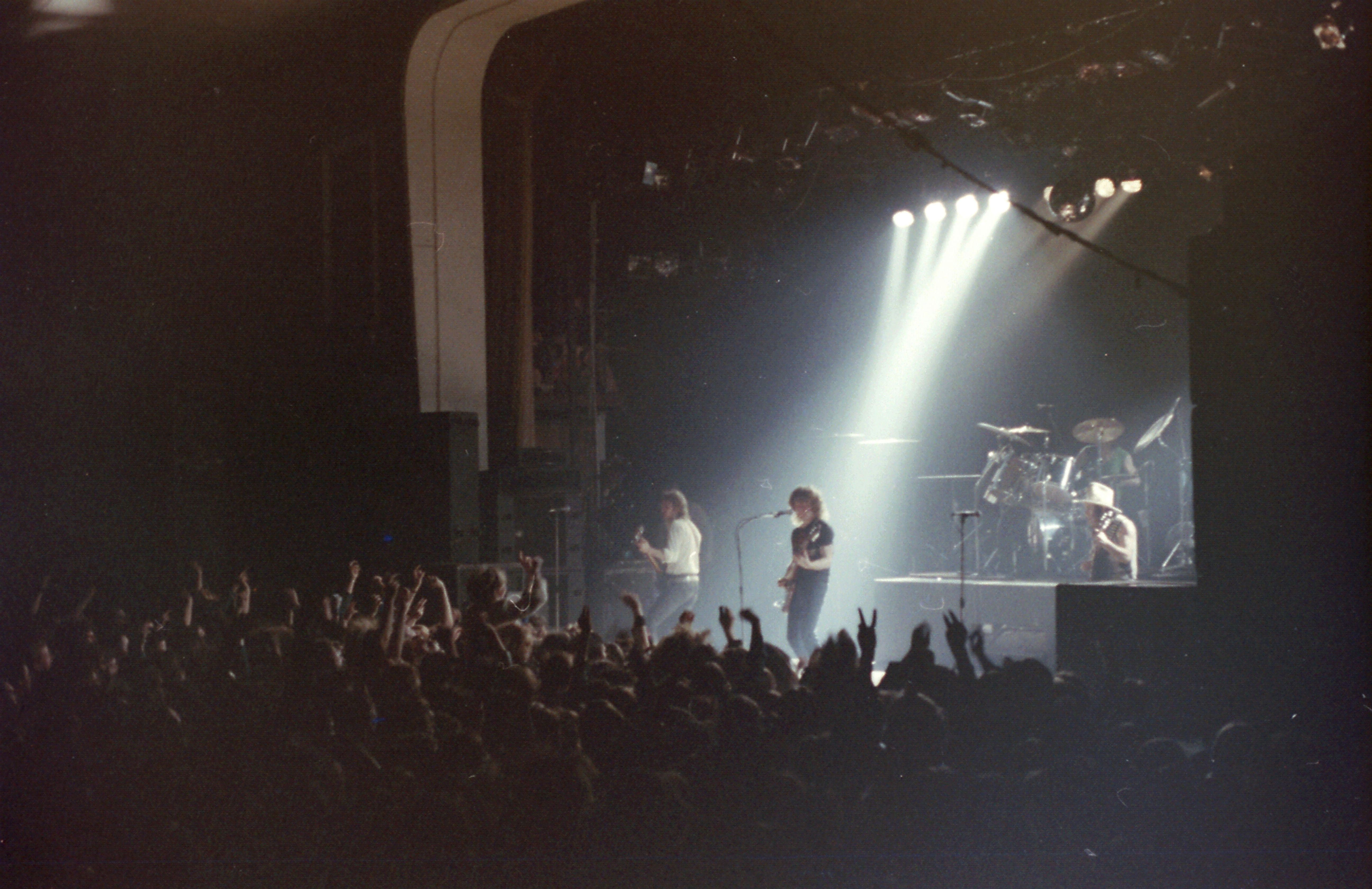
Slade performing at Sophia Gardens, Cardiff in December 1981

Ozzy Osbourne was due to play the Reading Festival in August 1980, during his Blizzard of Ozz tour, but cancelled at short notice as his band was not ready, leaving the organisers searching for a last-minute replacement. Slade were suggested, but Hill, still demoralised, had effectively left the band and initially refused to take part when asked by the other band members. Eventually, Chandler went to his home and convinced Hill to play what should have been a farewell performance in front of 65,000 rock fans. Instead of Slade's disbanding and disappearing without a trace, to Hill's astonishment, the band stole the show and quickly became the darlings of the music press and radio. Highlights of their performance were broadcast on BBC Radio 1's Friday Rock Show Reading special. Afterwards, the band signed to Cheapskate Records, owned by Chandler, Lea and his brother Frank, which gave the band more control of their material and products.

The band's new-found success led to a hurriedly released extended play, Alive at Reading, which reached number 44, the band's first chart action in the UK since 1977. Another extended play followed in November, titled "Xmas Ear Bender" which peaked at number 70. Polydor Records also saw an opportunity to capitalise on the band's new success and released the compilation Slade Smashes! at the beginning of November. The album was given plenty of promotion and spent 15 weeks in the UK chart, peaking at number 21. The album was certified UK Gold in December, having by then sold over 200,000 copies.

Keen to keep momentum with their new fans, the band set out to write a song with hit potential. The idea for the new track came after a performance in Amsterdam at the Paradiso Club. An enthusiastic audience who would not go home were overheard chanting by Lea, who was downstairs in the dressing room. Realising the potential of the chant, the song "We'll Bring the House Down" was written and released in January 1981. Aimed at the new audience which consisted of mainly heavy metal fans, it showed Slade's heavier rock sound. The single hit the number 10 spot in the UK, becoming Slade's first top ten hit since 1976. In March, an album consisting of four new tracks and six tracks from the previous album Return to Base was released. Also called We'll Bring the House Down it peaked at number 25.

"Wheels Ain't Coming Down", which originally appeared as the opening track on the album Return to Base, was released in March 1981 and reached number 60 in the UK. Although not a hit, it served to keep Slade in the public eye while they were writing new material and planning a European tour. Slade's success at the 1980 Reading festival was helping them fill large venues and led to their being asked about a return in 1981. The band refused to return so soon, and opted to play the Monsters of Rock festival at Castle Donington.

In May, the band released "Knuckle Sandwich Nancy" which featured lyrics commenting on the assault on Holder in the Welsh nightclub. Although eagerly wanted as a single by the band, Chandler was not entirely convinced and thus it was half-heartedly released and failed to chart. The band blamed Chandler for losing interest, and began to manage themselves. Chandler sold his share of Cheapskate Records and negotiated a favourable deal for the band with RCA Records. The new deal meant that Slade's records would get worldwide release except in the US and Canada. The next couple of UK singles were still released under the Cheapskate label but with RCA pressing and distributing the records, then a full RCA release could start.

The band's first full release on the RCA label was the European hit single "Lock Up Your Daughters" in late 1981. The track continued to follow a more heavy metal sound and made number 29 in the UK. The album Till Deaf Do Us Part followed in November 1981 and peaked at number 68. It remains Slade's most metal-directed and heaviest sounding album to date. An article in NME shortly after release claimed Slade were in trouble over the album cover, which featured an 'offensive' picture of a nail piercing an ear drum, and that a number of dealers were refusing to stock it. The cover was later changed on the CD reissue to a picture of the band in flames. In December, RCA released "Merry Xmas Everybody" for the first time since its initial outing. This time, however, it only managed to get to number 32.

By early 1982, the band had released a new single from the Till Deaf Do Us Part album, "Ruby Red". Although a gatefold release with two extra live tracks, it only managed to reach 51 in the UK chart. The opening track from the album, "Rock and Roll Preacher" was released exclusively in Germany in April. The first Slade single to have a 12" single version, it peaked at number 49. The song also became Slade's new show opener. In November, the band released a new single, "(And Now the Waltz) C'est La Vie", which was aimed directly at the Christmas market. It only made number 50 in the UK but was a hit in Poland where it reached number two. The band's version of the party track "Okey Cokey" was also re-released that year but failed to make an impact, much like the original release in 1979. Lastly, "Merry Xmas Everybody" was again re-released, this time only managing to get to number 67. December saw the release of Slade's third and final live album, Slade on Stage, which peaked at number 58 in the UK but received a positive response from critics. Lea continued working on solo projects throughout despite the upturn in Slade's fortunes.

=== American breakthrough (1983–1984) ===
Although Slade enjoyed some minor success, RCA Records had higher expectations and sent them away to write songs to be considered for release in 1983. The band came back with two possible singles, "My Oh My" and "Run Runaway". A raw demo of Holder singing "My Oh My" over Lea's piano was received with particular enthusiasm by RCA. The label was delighted with both the tracks and hired outside producer John Punter to work with the band to record them. This was the first time the band had another producer since Chandler. Punter's methods differed from those Slade were used to, in that the band recorded all their parts separately. This method eventually met with the band's approval, except for Holder, who believed this method was ruining their unique chemistry and was losing their rock and roll edge. The power ballad "My Oh My" was released in November 1983, where it slowly climbed the charts and by December, Slade found themselves competing for the Christmas number 1 spot. The single peaked at number 2 behind a cappella group The Flying Pickets with their cover of Yazoo's "Only You". The single was a success across Europe and topped the charts in Norway and Sweden. "Merry Xmas Everybody", again re-released, made number 20 that year.

The album The Amazing Kamikaze Syndrome, co-produced by Lea and Punter, was also released in December but, despite the strength of "My Oh My", had only made number 74 by the end of the year. To try to push the album further up the charts, January 1984 saw the release of "Run Runaway", a Celtic-flavoured rock jig featuring the return of Lea's fiddle. The single peaked at number seven in the UK and was also successful in a number of other European countries. The tactic of releasing a second single appeared to work and The Amazing Kamikaze Syndrome eventually reached number 49 in the UK. The album was far more successful in Sweden and Norway, where it peaked at number 1 and number 2 respectively. By the end of 1983, the band had finished what would prove to be their final UK tour.

In late 1983, Holder joined Lea in record production producing, among other things, Girlschool's cover of the T-Rex song "20th Century Boy" and the album Play Dirty which featured two Slade tracks, "Burning in the Heat of Love" and "High and Dry". Toward the end of the year, American glam metal band Quiet Riot released a cover version of "Cum on Feel the Noize" on Pasha Records and distributed by Columbia Records. It became a hit, peaking at number five in the Billboard 100, and helping their debut album Metal Health to the top, selling seven million copies on the way. As a result, Slade's original was re-released in the UK but only reached number 98. However, the success of a Slade track in the US charts prompted CBS Records to sign Slade to their CBS Associated label and in mid-1984, released the single "Run Runaway". The single eventually peaked at number 20 on the Billboard Hot 100 for a total of 17 weeks, and topped the American mainstream rock chart. It was Slade's first and only top 20 hit in the States. Its success, it has been suggested, was partly due to the accompanying music video which was filmed at Eastnor Castle in Ledbury, Herefordshire, England and was heavily shown on the MTV music channel. In August 1984, "My Oh My" was released in the US as a follow-up; it peaked at number 37 for a total of 11 weeks, again with the help of a heavily rotated music video on MTV. Quiet Riot meanwhile released another Slade song, "Mama Weer All Crazee Now", which peaked at number 51.

The Amazing Kamikaze Syndrome was reworked with a couple of alternative tracks and different artwork, and was released in North America as Keep Your Hands Off My Power Supply. The album was a success, getting to number 33 in the US and number 26 in Canada. The final single from the album was "Slam the Hammer Down" which peaked at number 92. A tour with Ozzy Osbourne was cancelled after several warm-up gigs, when Lea collapsed in the dressing room after a performance. He was later diagnosed with hepatitis C. The band returned to the UK and did not tour again, mainly due to differences within the band and problems in Holder's family life.

=== Second decline in popularity (1985–1990) ===
In mid-1984, Polydor released a new compilation, Slade's Greats, which peaked at number 89, and during the autumn a full European tour was announced to promote the album. Tickets were being sold before the band had agreed that the tour would actually take place: shortly afterwards, it was cancelled because Holder, who was facing a divorce from his first wife, was furious arrangements for the tour had gone ahead without his agreement. In late 1984, a new single, similar in style to "My Oh My" was released in the UK. Entitled "All Join Hands", the song made number 15 in the chart. "Merry Xmas Everybody" was also re-released, peaking at number 47 in the UK.

At the beginning of 1985, Slade released the single "7 Year Bitch" which stalled at number 60 in the UK when it failed to make radio playlists. The band protested that there had been no reaction to Elton John's "The Bitch Is Back" which was a hit record. The single did make number 39 in the German chart. A following single was released in March entitled "Myzsterious Mizster Jones". The single marked a return for Slade's trademark of spelling titles incorrectly, which had not been done since the 1973 hit "Skweeze Me, Pleeze Me". Despite being a radio-friendly track, the single only peaked at number 50 in the UK Neither "7 Year Bitch" nor "Myzsterious Mizster Jones" was released in America but the single "Little Sheila" was, where it reached number 86 in the Billboard chart and number 13 in the American mainstream rock chart. It was also released in Canada, where it got to number 50, and Germany.

Rogues Gallery, an album heavily reliant on Lea playing on synthesizer and the majority of instruments, was released in the UK during March, and in America during May. Reported to be one of the band's most polished productions, the band aimed to produce an album where all tracks were potential hit singles. Despite receiving critical acclaim in both Europe and America, the album failed to live up to commercial expectations, partly due to the lack of live appearances, and Slade were unable to retain their new-found American audience or rekindled British following, causing the band to largely fade from sight once more. In the UK, the album reached number 60, whilst in America it made number 132. The album was a hit in Norway, peaking at number 5. It also charted in other European countries.

In November, the band released a party album called Crackers – The Christmas Party Album which peaked at number 34 and was certified UK gold sales later that month. Repackaged on several occasions under various names such as The Party Album and Slade's Crazee Christmas; it contained Slade hits and songs that had been successful for other artists. Amazed at what Bob Geldof had achieved with Live Aid, Holder penned the lyrics to "Do You Believe in Miracles" which was also released in November. The single's earnings went to charity but it only peaked at number 54 in the UK. The final release of the year was another re-release of "Merry Xmas Everybody" which peaked at number 48 in the UK.

In 1986, two new Slade tracks, "We Won't Give In" and "Wild Wild Party", were used for the British film, Knights & Emeralds. That same year, the rock band The Redbeards From Texas released a cover of the 1972 Slade hit, "Gudbuy T'Jane" and in late 1986; "Okey Cokey" was re-released for the second time but failed to chart, whilst "Merry Xmas Everybody" was once again re-released, peaking at number 71. 1986 also saw Slade's first official fan convention at the Finsbury Leisure Centre, Old Street, London.

To avoid becoming a 'Christmas' hit band, Slade did not release the single "Still the Same" in December 1986 but left it until February 1987. The single was not a major hit, reaching number 73 in the UK, leaving RCA wondering whether it might have been a better idea to release it at Christmas. Released in April, "That's What Friends Are For" suffered a similar fate, peaking at number 95. Slade's final studio album, You Boyz Make Big Noize, was released a week later. It was produced by Roy Thomas Baker, Lea and Punter. The album was poorly promoted with no accompanying tour or music videos and spent just one week in the UK chart, peaking at number 98. Like much of Slade's later material, it fared better in Norway where it got to number 12.

Following the album's failure, RCA agreed to let Slade return to their own Cheapskate Records label, although RCA still continued distributing. A new single, also called "You Boyz Make Big Noize" was released in August. Influenced by the Beastie Boys' musical style, it lacked the synthesiser sound of the album. It was another commercial failure, just creeping into the top 100 at number 94. The single did not feature on the European version of the album but became the title track for the American version which was also released in August. The album was not successful in America, neither was the single "Ooh La La in L.A." despite receiving radio play in Los Angeles. In late 1987, "We Won't Give In" was released as a single in the UK, where it peaked at No. 121. The band's 1987 official fan convention was held at The Royal Standard Convention, Walthamstow, London.

In 1988, Slade released a cover of the Chris Montez song "Let's Dance"; a re-mix of the track from Crackers – The Christmas Party Album. The band held their third official fan club convention at Drummonds Convention, King's Cross, London. In late 1989, after what was initially supposed to be an 18-month break, Holder announced plans for a new album. Due to be released in 1990, the album never materialised, nor did the tour that would have followed had the album been a success. 1989 saw "Merry Xmas Everybody" make another new chart appearance, this time reaching number 99 the week after "Let's Party" by Jive Bunny and the Mastermixers, which sampled the song, topped the chart.

In 1989, Hill formed his own group, Blessings in Disguise, with ex-Wizzard keyboard player Bill Hunt, Craig Fenney and Bob Lamb. During 1990, Lea released his own version of Slade's "We'll Bring the House Down" under the name The Clout. At the end of the year, "Merry Xmas Everybody" was again re-released and peaked at number 93.

In late 1990, both Holder and Lea produced a cover of "Merry Xmas Everybody" by the band The Metal Gurus, known mainly as The Mission. The single peaked at number 55 in the UK and both Holder and Lea appeared in the song's music video, whilst Holder provided lead vocals on one of the single's b-sides, another Slade cover, "Gudbuy T'Jane". All artist royalties from the sale of the single were donated to Childline.

=== Brief comeback and break-up (1991–1992) ===
In April 1991, the Slade fan club-organised a 25th anniversary party. The band, who were invited, played one song, Chuck Berry's "Johnny B. Goode" which turned out to be their last live performance. In that same year, Lea produced the single "Where Have All the Good Girls Gone" for the Crybabys, which was not a success. Later, Polydor Records contacted Slade about a new compilation album. It was hoped that Slade would promote it by releasing two brand new singles and, if successful, would record a new studio album. The first single, "Radio Wall of Sound", written by Lea and originally intended for a solo project, was released in October. The compilation album, Wall of Hits was released the following month, along with a video compilation under the same name. Both the single and the album were moderately successful reaching number 21 and number 34 respectively. The album later went certified UK silver and in an attempt to promote it further, a second single, "Universe" was released in December. Despite a number of TV performances, the single failed to reach the top 100 of the UK Singles Chart. As a result, in January 1992, Polydor withdrew the option for a new album and future singles.

In March 1992, the band returned to Rich Bitch Studios to record a new house/dance-style version of "We'll Bring the House Down". However, by the end of the month, Holder had decided to finally leave the band. He had become weary of the constant arguing and discontent within the band, and effectively managing their day-to-day affairs. He left after 26 years with the band to explore other career paths. Lea briefly considered Slade continuing with a new singer and thought about approaching Ian Hunter, but ultimately chose to retire from the band as well. Powell filled the gap by helping out in a hotel his partner managed, but would soon re-join Hill to form Slade II later in the year.

=== Aftermath and later years (1993–present) ===
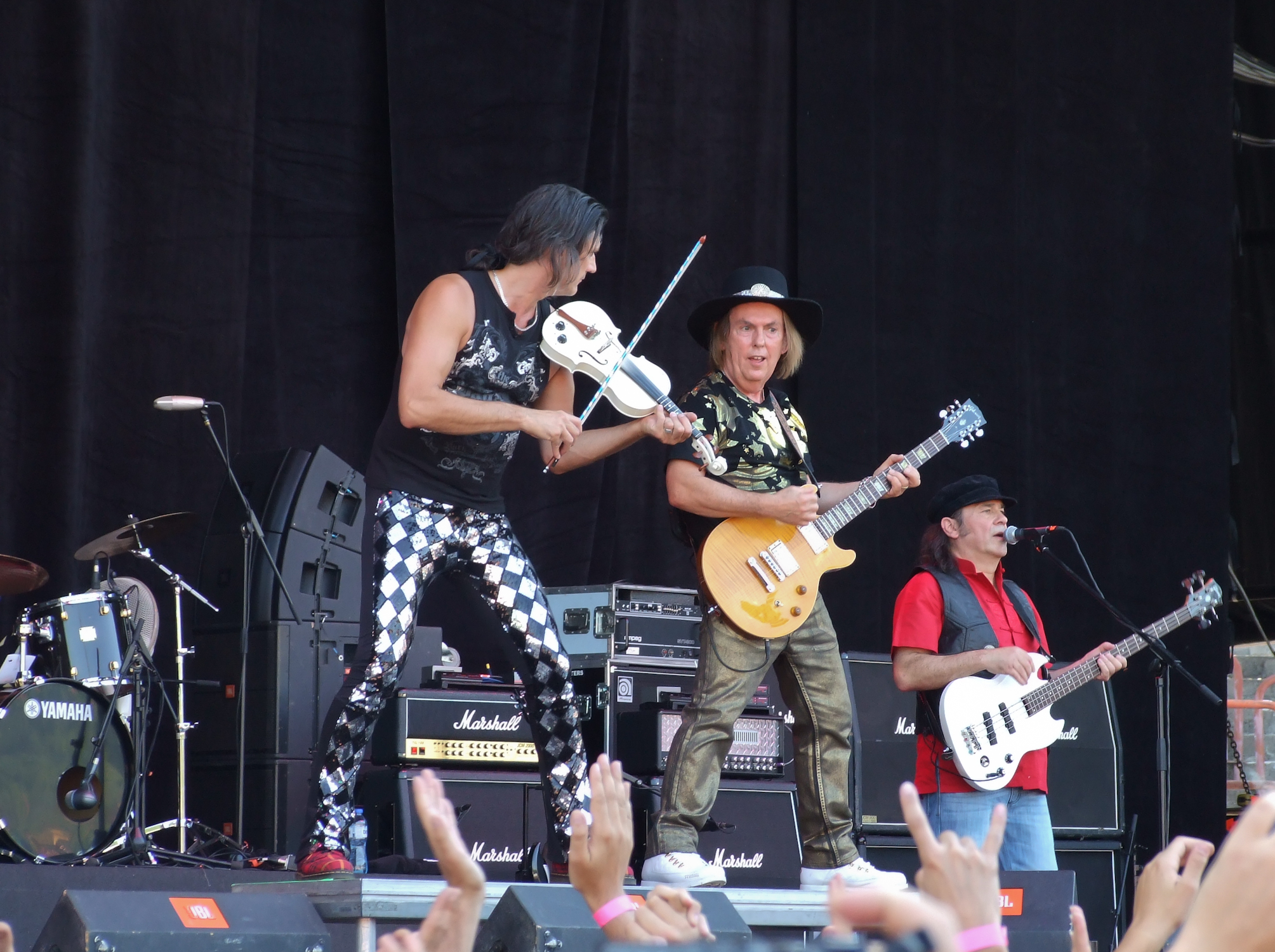
Slade performing in 2011, From left to right: John Berry, Dave Hill and Mal McNulty.

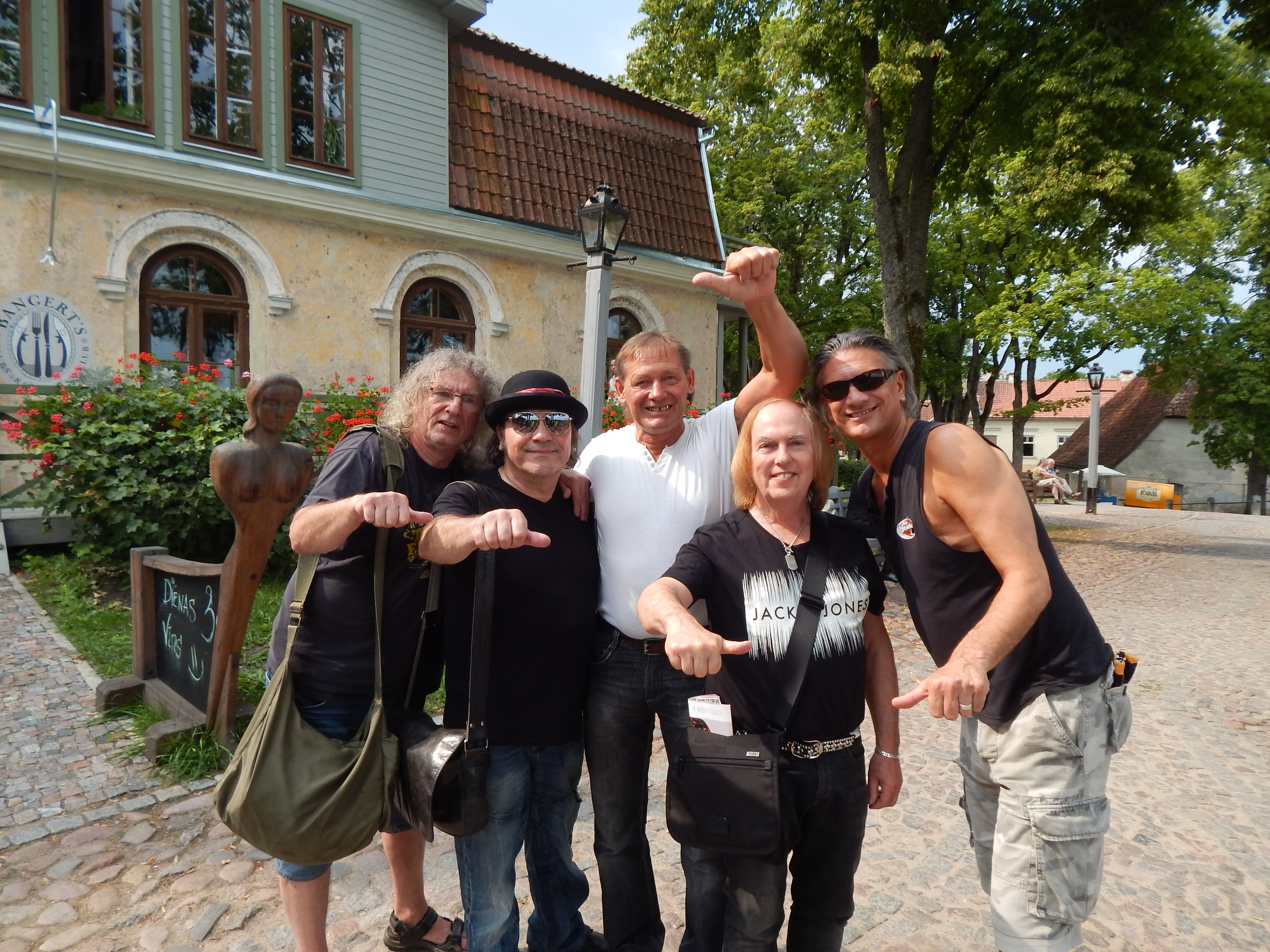
Slade posing with a fan in Kuldīga, 2015

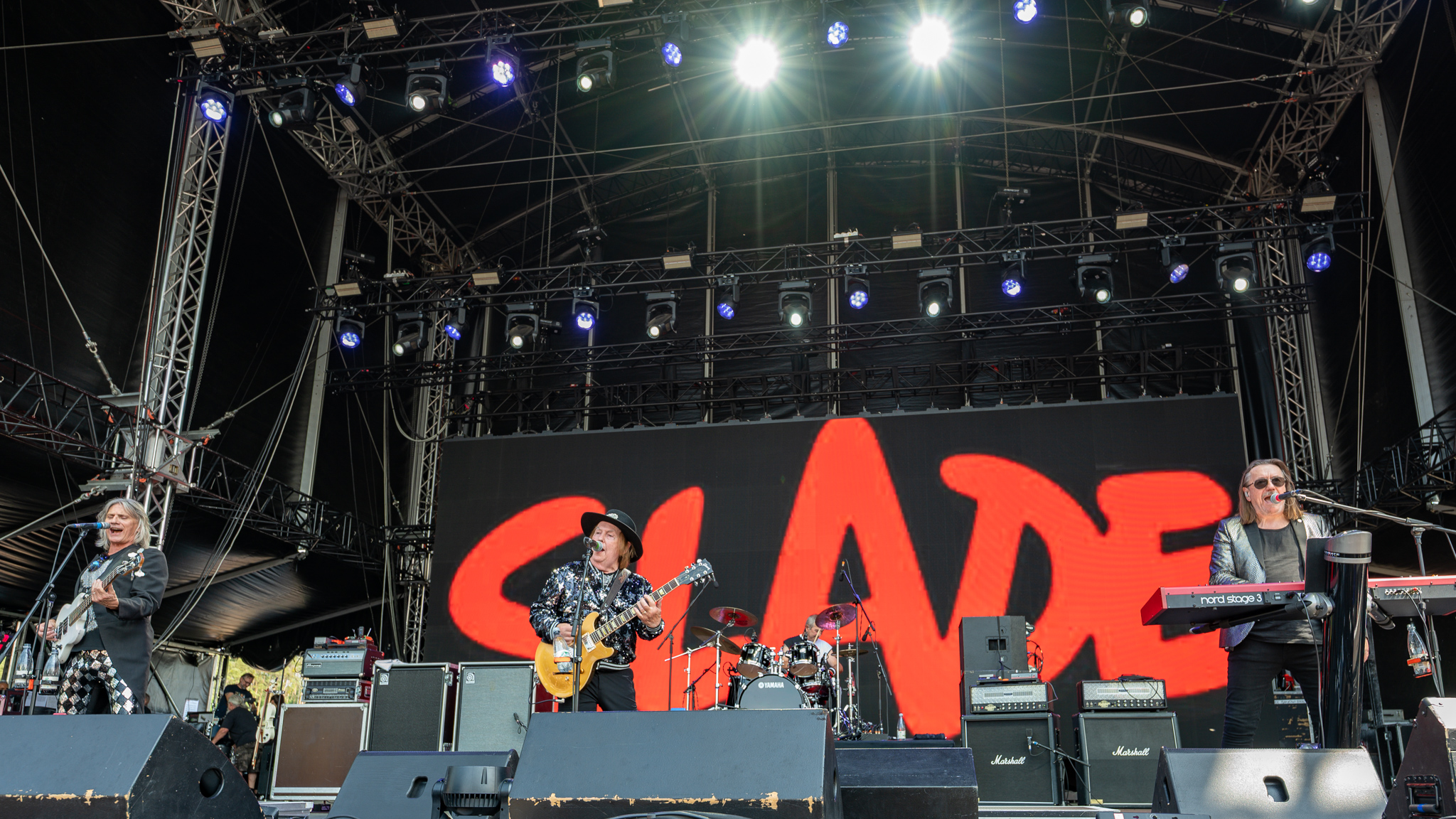
Slade performing in 2025

Slade II was formed in 1992 by Hill with Powell and three other musicians - Craig Fenney (bass), Steve Makin (guitar) and Steve Whalley (lead vocals and guitar). The suggestion to call the group Slade II came from Holder, but Lea was not happy with the Slade name being used at all. The group's name was only shortened to Slade again ten years later. Working solidly on the UK theatre circuit during the winter months and throughout Europe the rest of the year, the band released one studio album in 1994 entitled Keep on Rockin', which featured Steve Whalley on vocals. The album was not successful, nor were the singles "Hot Luv" and "Black and White World". The band have seen a number of line-ups (including Dave Glover on bass, plus Mal McNulty on guitar and vocals and John Berry on bass and vocals) but Hill has remained constant throughout.

Slade were reunited for two events during 1996: the funeral of long-time Slade manager Chas Chandler and an episode of the television show This Is Your Life which featured Holder as the subject. Also in 1996, a compilation entitled The Genesis of Slade was released, which contained rare and some previously unreleased material from The Vendors, Steve Brett & The Mavericks and The 'N Betweens. During 1997, a new Slade compilation, Feel the Noize – Greatest Hits, reached number 19 in the UK, while in the following year, a remix of "Merry Xmas Everybody", released under the name Slade Vs. Flush, made number 30.

In 1999, BBC One broadcast a newly made documentary on the band, titled It's Slade, which featured new interviews with all four members of the band, along with various other musical artists and celebrities such as Ozzy Osbourne, Noel Gallagher, Status Quo, Toyah Willcox and Suzi Quatro. It was narrated by Radio One's Mark Radcliffe. In 2000, Holder was appointed as a Member of the Most Excellent Order of the British Empire for his services to music and his voice was famously recorded for lift announcements at the Walsall New Art Gallery.

In 2002, Slade II shortened their name to Slade and re-released their album Keep on Rockin' with a handful of new tracks included, retitled Cum on Let's Party. The band also released two new singles, titled "Some Exercise" and "Take Me Home". Both singles were released in Belgium through Virgin Records. In 2003, incarcerated serial killer Rosemary West announced her engagement to bassist Dave Glover. The supposed engagement was called off shortly afterwards and Glover was summarily fired from Slade by Dave Hill. Glover admitted having written to her about the case, but denied any romantic involvement. An American compilation was released by Shout! Factory in 2004, titled Get Yer Boots On: The Best of Slade.

In 2005, Steve Whalley, original singer for Slade II, left the band and was replaced by Mal McNulty, who sung for the band until 2019, when Russell Keefe took over. In November 2005, Polydor released a new Slade compilation, The Very Best of Slade, which peaked at number 39 in the UK. A DVD was also released for the first time, featuring a collection of Slade videos and promos. From 2006 to 2007, music label Salvo remastered and released all of Slade's catalogue, including a four-disc anthology set entitled The Slade Box (Anthology 1969–1991) and a package of all live albums in one Slade Alive! - The Live Anthology. The remastered series also included the release of a new compilation called simply B-Sides, which featured all of the band's B-sides. Shout! Factory also released the compilation In for a Penny: Raves & Faves in 2007.

In late 2006, UK chart rules changed to allow downloads of old singles eligible to chart, which allowed "Merry Xmas Everybody" to return to the chart. It has re-entered the UK Top 75 every Christmas since then, most successfully in 2007 when it peaked at number 20 and in 2018 when it peaked at number 16. In 2009, a new compilation was released, Live at the BBC. It featured songs recorded for BBC sessions between 1969 and 1972, Radio 1 jingles recorded in 1973 and 1974, and, on the second disc, songs recorded live at the Paris Theatre, London, in August 1972. In November 2009, Universal Music released a new compilation entitled Merry Xmas Everybody: Party Hits, which peaked at number 151 in the UK. In 2010, all four original members of Slade attended a business meeting hoping that maybe this could lead to the band reuniting for a farewell tour. However, the meeting soon dissolved into the same continued arguments on matters spanning back to the band's original break-up, and led to such an idea being dismissed. Holder said in 2015: “It really saddens me that the four guys who were in Slade can’t get together and sit round the dinner table. Five years ago I got the four of us together so we could air our grievances face to face, but it was so painful I’d never want to repeat it. I was shocked.”

In 2011, Salvo released a remastered version of Sladest which included a previously unreleased studio version of the live track "Hear Me Calling". On the evening of 21 December 2012, BBC Four held Slade Night, which consisted of a showing of the 1999 documentary It's Slade, Slade at the BBC, and the band's 1975 film Slade in Flame respectively. Slade at the BBC is a compilation of the band's performances from the BBC archives throughout their career from 1969 to 1991, introduced by Noddy Holder. According to BARB, the viewing figure for It's Slade was 608,000 whilst Slade at the BBC had a total of 477,000 viewers.

After years of working with Lise Lyng Falkenberg, since 2006, Powell's biography Look Wot I Dun – My Life in Slade was released on 14 October 2013, by Omnibus Press (Music Sales Ltd). The book is based on more than 50 hours of interviews with Powell as well as his own 20 years of diaries and notebooks he kept due to his problems with short-term memory following his 1973 accident. Additionally the book featured contributions and quotes from interviews of 28 of Powell's friends, colleagues and family members. It looks in detail at Slade's long career and Powell's life, which included booze-ups with Ozzy Osbourne. To promote the book, Powell appeared at a number of Waterstones book signings, as well as a charity "Tea with Don Powell" event, a question and answer session, where Powell discussed his life with Clive Eakin of BBC Coventry & Warwick. It was in support of the National Autistic Society. In 2015, the box set When Slade Rocked the World was released.

On 3 February 2020, Powell announced on his official website that Hill had sent him a "cold email" informing him that his services were no longer required. Hill disputes this version of events, stating that Don Powell's version of the circumstances of the break-up were inaccurate. Powell also announced that he would be forming "Don Powell's Slade" with former Slade II bassist Craig Fenney. Powell was replaced by Alex Bines. Powell's statement was removed from his website shortly afterwards.

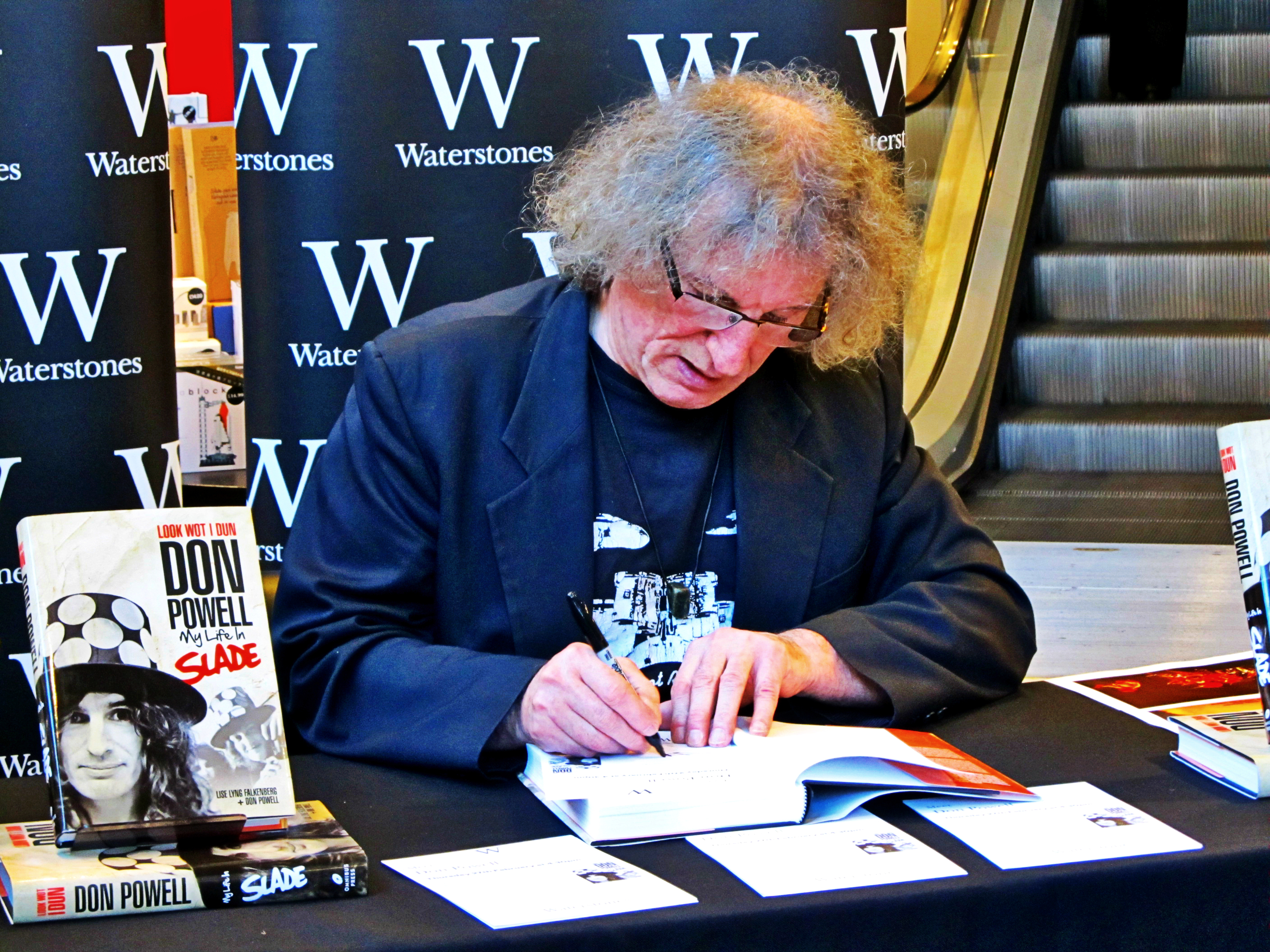
Don Powell signing copies of his biography Look Wot I Dun – My Life in Slade at Liverpool One's Waterstones in 2014

During 2020 and 2021, Powell, Holder and Lea conducted an extensive series of Zoom video interviews for the www.slayed.co.uk website and its forum at www.sladeforum.co.uk - comments from which were mined for the expanded second edition of the book on their unauthorised discography, The Noize.

In late 2022, Lea and Powell reunited in the recording studio (with Johnny Howells and Mick Marson of the pre-Slade group The 'N Betweens) to record a number of songs for a Lea project. The only track that has been released so far was the limited edition CD single of "Train Kept A-Rollin'", on the Noize Recordings label. A video was made for the song. "The Train Kept A Rollin'" reached number 3 on the Heritage Chart on 14 May 2023.

In 2025, the group – now billed as Dave Hill's Slade – announced one final UK tour titled "Slade – The Final Tour" during the run-up to Christmas. The tour included dates in Hastings, Liverpool, Bournemouth, London, Birmingham and Manchester plus other cities across the UK. The band had already taken a number of live dates for 2026, but Hill did not count individual dates as 'tours'.

Former vocalist and guitarist Steve Whalley died from a heart attack in September 2025.

== Musical style ==
Many Slade songs were written specifically for audience participation, such as "Get Down and Get With It", "Mama Weer All Crazee Now", "Cum on Feel the Noize", "Give Us a Goal", "We'll Bring The House Down", "Rock and Roll Preacher" and "My Oh My". In the days before Slade, Holder, Lea, Hill and Powell were influenced by American blues artists such as Sonny Boy Williamson II, John Lee Hooker and Howlin' Wolf but then became interested in the work of Little Richard. Later they were to draw artistic influence from contemporary rock acts including the Beatles, Chuck Berry, Joe Brown, Cream, the Kinks, Wilson Pickett, Otis Redding, the Rolling Stones, Rufus Thomas, the Who, the Pretty Things, and Screaming Lord Sutch. Chas Chandler's connections with The Animals and Jimi Hendrix also had an influence.

The 1969 album Beginnings, released under the name Ambrose Slade, featured many songs that basically comprised their live act with covers of psychedelic rock and classic 1960s rocksongs by Steppenwolf, Ted Nugent, Frank Zappa, The Moody Blues, The Beatles and Marvin Gaye.

Play It Loud (1970), the first album that was released as Slade, showed more of a progressive rock sound.

Their 1972 live album, Slade Alive!, featured cover versions of songs by Ten Years After, The Lovin' Spoonful, Bobby Marchan and Steppenwolf. It was on the album that the band began to develop their most recognisable sound, and which saw the first efforts of the commercially successful Holder-Lea songwriting partnership.

The 1971 single "Coz I Luv You", and the 1973 B-side Kill 'Em At The Hot Club Tonite were inspired by the gypsy swing of the Quintette du Hot Club de France, especially the guitar and violin styles of Django Reinhardt and Stéphane Grappelli.

Slayed? (1972) merged glam rock with classic rock, and whilst the 1974 album, Old New Borrowed and Blue, continued in this vein, it also featured pop-rock, rock ballads and novelty tracks. The next album was the 1974 soundtrack Slade in Flame which saw a return to 1960s classic rock, to fit with the theme of the film. The single from the album, "Far Far Away" had an acoustic rock sound, whereas the following single "How Does It Feel?" featured the use of brass and woodwind instruments.

In 1975, while residing in the States, Slade was influenced by Southern boogie rock bands and as a result, Nobody's Fools featured a wide mixture of styles including soul, country, rock, funk, folk and blues. The album also featured some soulful female backing vocalists. After the band returned to the UK in 1977, they began to merge their American influences with a classic, hard rock. Return to Base (1979) featured elements of classic rock, acoustic rock, rock ballads, ambient rock and rock and roll. Two albums, released in 1981; We'll Bring the House Down and Till Deaf Do Us Part adopted a hard rock and heavy metal sound, as a result of the band's revival amongst heavy metal fans, following their success at the Reading Festival.

The 1983 album The Amazing Kamikaze Syndrome featured a change in musical direction, with a more commercial-friendly rock sound on some tracks, mixed with hard rock and glam metal influences. Some of the tracks hinted at a motor racing theme. One single from the album, "My Oh My" followed a power ballad sound, whilst the next single, "Run Runaway" was reminiscent of a Scottish jig. Slade's next album, Rogues Gallery featured a strong use of synthesisers, which were a popular instrument in the latter half of the 1980s as did the band's final album You Boyz Make Big Noize, although this album had a slightly grittier hard rock sound.

== Legacy and influence ==
Slade have influenced artists including: Nirvana, the Smashing Pumpkins, the Ramones, Sex Pistols, the Clash, Kiss, Mötley Crüe, Quiet Riot, Poison, Def Leppard, Cheap Trick, Twisted Sister, the Undertones, the Replacements and the Runaways. Other artists include Hanoi Rocks, Queen, Kirka, Hot Leg, Candlebox, Cock Sparrer and Girlschool. Their anarchic attitude was adopted by the Damned, the Wonder Stuff, and Oasis, the latter of whom covered "Cum on Feel the Noize". Comedians Vic Reeves, Bob Mortimer, Paul Whitehouse and Mark Williams affectionately parodied the band in a number of what the band called 'hysterically accurate' "Slade in Residence" and "Slade on Holiday" sketches, in their The Smell of Reeves and Mortimer television programme in the early 1990s.

Joey Ramone stated "I spent most of the early 70s listening to Slade Alive! thinking to myself, "Wow – this is what I want to do. I want to make that kind of intensity for myself. A couple of years later I was at CBGB's doing my best Noddy Holder." Steve Jones of the Sex Pistols stated "Slade never compromised. We always had the feeling that they were on our side. I don't know but I think we were right." NME commented on Slade's legacy in a review of a greatest hits album, "They embodied the glorious absurdity of the greatest pop, in the sideburns, the mirrored top hat and Dave Hill's pudding bowl haircut. As such they were the simplest, most effective possible, riposte to prog rock's bloated pretensions and pseudo-intellect." In 1981, Adam and the Ants' then-lead guitarist and co-songwriter Marco Pirroni, who now owns Dave Hill's original trademark 'Superyob' guitar, stated that he was greatly influenced by the first gig he ever attended which was Slade at Wembley Pool in 1973.

TV presenter Gareth Jones, also known as Gaz Top, is a known Slade fan who hosted the 1986 Slade documentary "Slade Perseverance". Jones also appeared at the 1986 and 1987 official Slade fan club conventions. Other famous Slade fans include English ex-football player Gary Lineker and former Welsh football player Nigel Vaughan, whom Lea and Hill visited on Boxing Day 1989 at the football ground of Wolverhampton Wanderers.

Ozzy Osbourne commented during a Slade documentary, "Noddy Holder's got one of greatest voices in rock ever." On his show, 'Breakfast With Alice' on Planet Rock, Alice Cooper stated "I love Slade. One of the oddest-looking bands of all time... Twisted Sister lived on Slade, and so did Quiet Riot pretty much. They wrote the catchiest songs around." In 2008, Nikki Sixx of Mötley Crüe said, '"...like with Alice Cooper and Bowie and Slade – those fucking bands gave 150 percent. It was about fashion, it was about music, it was about pushing the envelope". Status Quo bassist John "Rhino" Edwards stated in a 2010 interview, "I thought the best violin player was Jimmy Lea out of Slade. Oh, he's just brilliant. He's a brilliant musician, that guy. He's a serious bass player. That band (Slade) are so underrated as players. So original." Former Deep Purple guitarist Ritchie Blackmore said of them, "They are a good group because they don't care about the notes and there is a public wanting that. Another group might be too inhibited to do what they do." According to former Thin Lizzy guitarist Eric Bell, the band's frontman Phil Lynott developed his stagecraft after watching Holder perform with Slade each night of their November 1972 tour, on which Thin Lizzy were an opening act.

Former Twisted Sister vocalist Dee Snider once described Twisted Sister as Slade meets the Sex Pistols. Twisted Sister's guitarist Jay Jay French stated "I would say our direct lineage these days is a bit of Slade and Alice Cooper." On the 2011 final Mark Radcliffe & Stuart Maconie BBC Radio Two show, Manic Street Preachers bassist Nicky Wire stated that he believed Slade's post-Reading material was very underrated.

Former Kiss bassist Gene Simmons stated that his band's early songwriting ethos and stage performance was influenced by Slade. In his book Kiss and Make-Up, Simmons wrote "... we liked the way they (Slade) connected with the crowd and the way they wrote anthems... we wanted that same energy, that same irresistible simplicity". Tom Petersson of Cheap Trick said that his band went to see Slade perform, and that they (Slade) used "every cheap trick in the book", thus inadvertently coining his group's name. Cheap Trick covered the song "When the Lights Are Out" on their 2009 release, The Latest. Quiet Riot had US hits with covers of "Cum on Feel the Noize" and "Mama Weer All Crazee Now". The origins of Slade's influence on Quiet Riot date back to the early 1970s, when Kevin DuBrow photographed Slade during their first Los Angeles appearance at the Whisky a Go Go. However, Quiet Riot drummer Frankie Banali claims that DuBrow was not a fan of Slade, favouring fellow British rock bands Queen and Humble Pie.

In 1971, Record Mirror magazine voted Slade number 10 in the top UK groups based on singles for the year. During 1972, the then popular teen magazine, Fab 208, voted the band "Group of the Year" whilst in the Record Mirror magazine that same year; Slade were voted number two in the most promising British groups list, number five in the top 18 groups list and number 17 in the male groups category. Also in 1972, Slade were voted number one top band and leading recording act in the NME magazine chart points survey, and number one top live band. Radio Luxembourg presented Slade with the award for "Britain's act/group of the year" in 1973.

In February 1973, Slade were voted Best Live Band by the Disc Music Awards. The same year, the band were again voted the world's top group in the NME Poll and top group in the BBC World Service Poll. In April 1973, Record Mirror magazine ranked Slade at number three of top 10 in both the album and singles band chart. Record Mirror's exclusive chart survey was based on a point system allocated according to position and length of time in UK charts for the first three months of the year. In July 1973, Record Mirror magazine ranked Slade at number six of 10 in the UK group singles chart and number 3 in the UK group albums chart. In 1973 and 1974, the band received the Carl-Alan award for Top Group.

In early 1974, the band were voted the number one foreign group by Spain's biggest music magazine of the time and were voted best overseas group in Finland, Belgium and Ireland. The Disc Music Awards rated Slade as the best live group and top British group. Slade made number four in the "top groups in the world" category. Individual members were also acknowledged; Noddy Holder was number five in the best British male singers whilst Jim Lea made number nine in the top songwriter list. In the Record and Radio Mirror poll results of 1974, Slade were voted top British group, with Holder number two in the top British male singer list. Dave Hill and Jim Lea made the top British guitarist list at number one and seven respectively. Lea also appeared at number nine in the top British keyboardist list and number two in the miscellaneous instruments list. Don Powell was voted top British percussionist. The band collected the 1974 Belgian award for Best World Group.

In February 1976, Record Mirror magazine voted Slade the third best UK group with Noddy Holder number eight in the best male singer and number six in the best songwriter categories. In 1980, Record Mirror voted the band number one for the most inspired comeback of the year.

== Band members ==
=== Current ===
Image	Name	Years active	Instruments	Release contributions
	Dave Hill	1963–present	guitar; vocals	all releases
	John Berry	2003–present	bass; violin; backing vocals; lead vocals (2019–present)	none to date
	Russell Keefe	2019–present	lead and backing vocals; keyboards	none to date
	Alex Bines	2020–present	drums	none to date

=== Former ===
Image	Name	Years active	Instruments	Release contributions
	Don Powell	1963–2020	drums	
	John Howells	1963–1966	lead vocals; harmonica	none
	Mick Marson	1963–1966	guitar	none
	Bill Diffey	1963–1964	bass	none
	Dave "Cass" Jones	1964–1966	bass	none
	Jim Lea	1966–1992	bass; keyboards; piano; violin; vocals	all releases from Beginnings (1969) to You Boyz Make Big Noize (1987); Slade Alive! – The Live Anthology (2006); Live at the BBC (2009)
	Noddy Holder	1966–1992	lead vocals; guitar	all releases from Beginnings (1969) to You Boyz Make Big Noize (1987); Slade Alive! – The Live Anthology (2006); Live at the BBC (2009)
	Steve Whalley	1992–2005 (died 2025)	lead vocals; guitar	Keep on Rockin' (1994)
	Steve Makin	1992–1996	guitar	none
	Craig Fenney	1992–1994	bass; vocals	none
	Trevor Holliday	1994–2000	bass; keyboards; vocals	Keep on Rockin' (1994)
	Dave Glover	2000–2003	bass; vocals	none
	Mal McNulty	2005–2019	lead vocals; guitar; bass	none

=== Line-ups ===
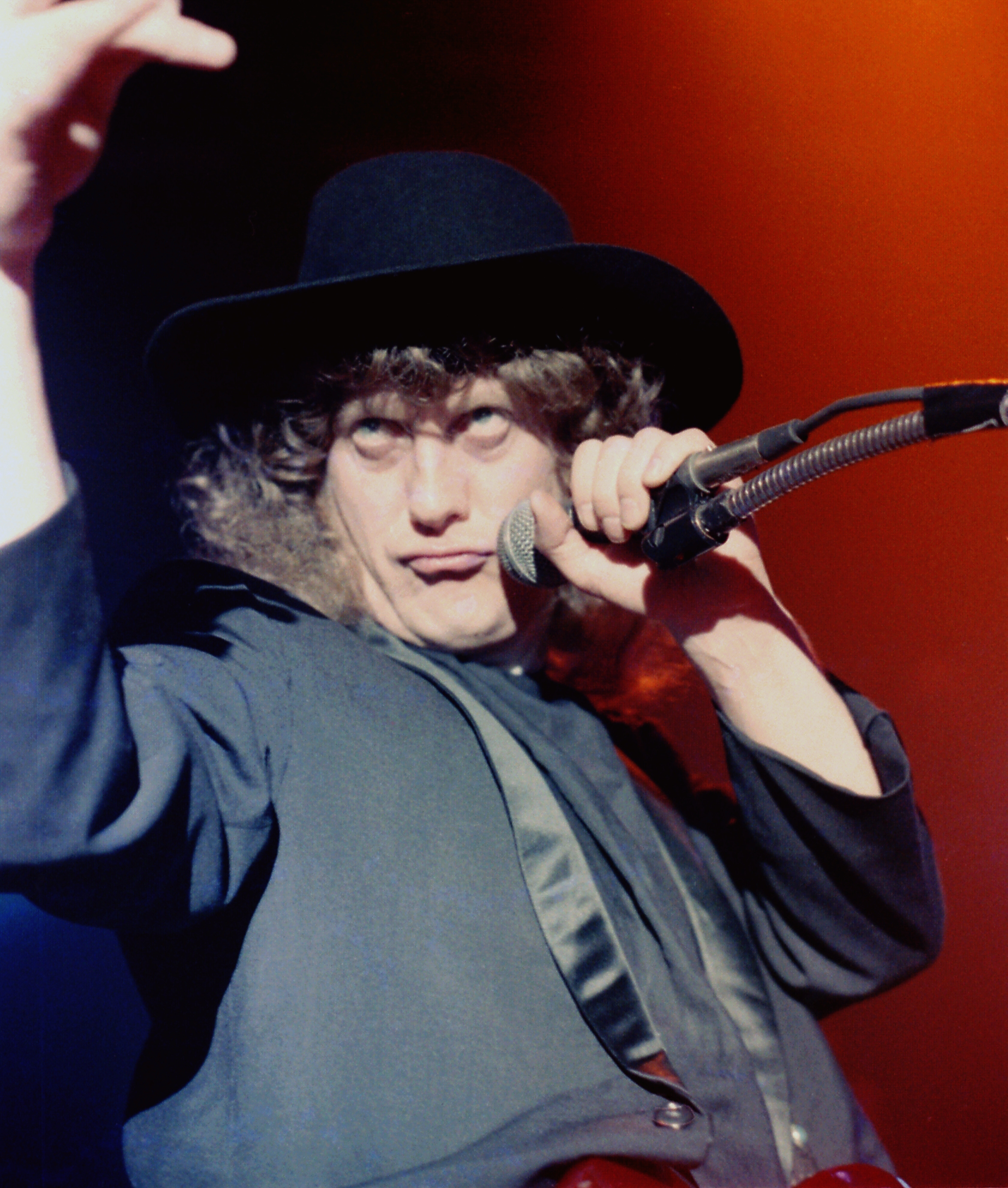
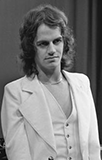
Since 1992, the band has gone through multiple lineup changes following the departures of key members Noddy Holder (left) and Jim Lea (right), who wrote the majority of the band's songs. Until 2020, Dave Hill and Don Powell were the only constant members until Powell was fired that year, with Hill being the only constant member.
- Members of the classic lineup are in **bold**.

1963–1964	**(The Vendors)**: John Howells – vocals, harmonica; Mick Marson – guitar; **Dave Hill** – guitar; Bill Diffey – bass; **Don Powell** – drums
1964–1966	**(The N' Betweens)**: John Howells – vocals, harmonica; Mick Marson – guitar; **Dave Hill** – guitar; **Don Powell** – drums; Cass Jones – bass
1966–1992	**(The N' Betweens, 1966–1969 / Ambrose Slade, 1969, / The Slade, 1969–1970, / Slade, 1970–1992)**: **Dave Hill** – guitar, vocals; **Don Powell** – drums; **Noddy Holder** – vocals, guitar, occasional live bass; **Jim Lea** – bass, keyboards, piano, violin, vocals
1992–1994	**(Slade II)**: **Dave Hill** – guitar, vocals; **Don Powell** – drums; Steve Whalley – vocals, guitar; Steve Makin – guitar; Craig Fenney – bass, vocals
1994–1996	**(Slade II)**: **Dave Hill** – guitar, vocals; **Don Powell** – drums; Steve Whalley – vocals, guitar; Steve Makin – guitar; Trevor Holliday – bass, keyboards, vocals
1996–2000	**(Slade II)**: **Dave Hill** – guitar, vocals; **Don Powell** – drums; Steve Whalley – vocals, guitar; Trevor Holliday – bass, keyboards, vocals
2000–2003	**(Slade II, 2000–2002 / Slade 2003–present)**: **Dave Hill** – guitar, vocals; **Don Powell** – drums; Steve Whalley – vocals, guitar; Dave Glover – bass, vocals
2003–2005	**Dave Hill** – guitar, vocals; **Don Powell** – drums; Steve Whalley – vocals, guitar; John Berry – bass, violin, vocals
2005–2019	**Dave Hill** – guitar, vocals; **Don Powell** – drums; John Berry – bass, violin, vocals; Mal McNulty – vocals, guitar, bass
2019–2020	**Dave Hill** – guitar, vocals; **Don Powell** – drums; John Berry – vocals, bass, violin; Russell Keefe – vocals, keyboards
2020–present	**Dave Hill** – guitar, vocals; John Berry – vocals, bass, violin; Russell Keefe – vocals, keyboards; Alex Bines – drums

== Discography ==
- Beginnings (as Ambrose Slade, 1969)
- Play It Loud (1970)
- Slayed? (1972)
- Old New Borrowed and Blue (1974)
- Slade in Flame (1974)
- Nobody's Fools (1976)
- Whatever Happened to Slade (1977)
- Return to Base (1979)
- We'll Bring the House Down (1981)
- Till Deaf Do Us Part (1981)
- The Amazing Kamikaze Syndrome (1983), re-released in 1984 as Keep Your Hands Off My Power Supply
- Rogues Gallery (1985)
- Crackers - The Christmas Party Album (1985)
- You Boyz Make Big Noize (1987)
- Keep on Rockin' (1994) (as Slade II), re-released in 2002 as Cum on Let's Party

== Biographies ==
- The Slade Story by George Tremlett. London: Futura Publications, 1975. ISBN 0-86007-193-6
- Slade, Feel the Noize!: An Illustrated Biography by Chris Charlesworth. London: Omnibus Press, 1984. ISBN 0-7119-0538-X
- Slade – Perseverance: 25 Years of Noize: A Discography compiled by Morten Langkilde Rasmussen. Hvidovre: M. Langkilde Rasmussen, 1996. ISBN 87-984979-2-8
- Who's Crazee Now?: My Autobiography by Noddy Holder with Lisa Verrico. London: Ebury Press, 2000 ISBN 0-09-187503-X
- Cum On Feel the Noize! The Story of Slade by Alan Parker & Steve Grantley. London: Carlton Books, 2006 ISBN 978-1-84442-151-0
- Look Wot I Dun: My Life in Slade by Don Powell and Lise Lyng Falkenberg. London: Omnibus Press, 2013 ISBN 978-1-78305-040-6
- So Here It Is: The Autobiography by Dave Hill. Unbound, 2017 ISBN 978-1-78352-420-4
- WHATEVER HAPPENED TO SLADE by Daryl Easlea, Omnibus, 2023 ISBN 978-1783055548
- Wild! Wild Wild!: A People's History of Slade by Malcolm Wyatt, Spenwood, 2023 ISBN 978-1915858078

== See also ==
- List of songs by Slade
- List of glam rock artists
- List of artists by total number of UK number one singles
- List of performers on Top of the Pops

== Sources ==
- Du Noyer, Paul (2003). The Illustrated Encyclopaedia of Music (1st ed.). Fulham, London: Flame Tree Publishing. ISBN 978-1-904041-96-2.
- Roberts, David (2006). British Hit Singles & Albums (19th ed.). London: Guinness World Records Limited. ISBN 978-1-904994-10-7.
