= The Amazing Kamikaze Syndrome =

Studio album by Slade
- Released: 9 December 1983
- Studio: Portland Studios; RAK, London, UK
- Genre: Hard rock
- Length: 42:29
- Label: RCA Records
- Producer: Jim Lea, John Punter

Slade chronology
Slade On Stage (1982)	The Amazing Kamikaze Syndrome (1983)	Keep Your Hands Off My Power Supply (1984)

Singles from The Amazing Kamikaze Syndrome
- 1. "(And Now the Waltz) C'est La Vie" Released: 12 November 1982; 2. "My Oh My" Released: 11 November 1983; 3. "Run Runaway" Released: 27 January 1984; 4. "Slam the Hammer Down" Released: 1984

The Amazing Kamikaze Syndrome is the eleventh studio album by the British rock group Slade. It was released on 9 December 1983 and reached No. 49 in the UK charts. The album was produced largely by bassist Jim Lea. The two UK Top 10 singles released from the album, "My Oh My" and "Run Runaway", were produced by John Punter.

In 1984, the album was re-packaged and released as Keep Your Hands Off My Power Supply by CBS Associated records in the United States and Canada. Both "Run Runaway" and "My Oh My" were US Top 40 hits that year, giving the band their long-awaited breakthrough there.

== Background ==
Following Slade's performance at the Reading festival in 1980, interest in the band was revived and a major record deal with RCA signed. The Amazing Kamikaze Syndrome was the band's second studio album for the label and had mostly been recorded in 1982. In November that year, the album's first single, "(And Now the Waltz) C'est La Vie", was released and reached No. 50 in the UK. However, in early 1983, RCA felt the recorded tracks for the album lacked potential chart hits and in the effort to amend that, RCA suggested the band work with producer John Punter. Lead vocalist Noddy Holder and Lea then wrote and demoed two songs; "My Oh My" and "Run Runaway". Both were received with enthusiasm by RCA and Punter was hired to work on the two tracks. Holder said of working with Punter in 1984, "What was good about John is he didn't take away from our normal sound, [only] added a bit more class to it. He just gave us a much more commercial sound, so it had much more mass appeal, I think."

Released in November 1983, "My Oh My" became a UK No. 2 hit over the Christmas period. The success of the single led to RCA rush-releasing The Amazing Kamikaze Syndrome on 9 December, rather than February 1984. The album reached No. 49 in the UK and was a success across Europe. In January 1984, the second single "Run Runaway" reached No. 7. The success of Quiet Riot's version of "Cum on Feel the Noize" in late 1983 led to Slade signing with CBS, who would repackage The Amazing Kamikaze Syndrome into Keep Your Hands Off My Power Supply in 1984.

The album's title was suggested by Holder. In a 1983 interview, he revealed:

"I was reading the sports pages one day and there was an article on motor sport. It talked about the 'kamikaze complex' those guys who compete seem to have in putting their life on the line every time they go on the track. I think Barry Sheene was mentioned as a specific example. Anyway, it struck me that some of our songs fitted in with this idea, so the title seemed a logical choice. And let's face it, everyone has something of that complex in 'em, we all take gambles at some point in our lives."

== Release ==
In a 1986 fan club interview, Holder spoke of the band's wish that a follow-up single from the album had been released following "Run Runaway". He said: "We all felt that there should have been a single out on the back of "Run Runaway". The album was our first big success in America, it was Top 5 all over Europe and Number 1 in Scandinavia for months. Britain was the only place it wasn't a big album. We could have, theoretically, had another single off it. It would have been a hit. There was plenty of good stuff on that album."

== Promotion ==
During the album's release in December, the band had already embarked on a UK college tour. With the success of "My Oh My", the band were also appearing on UK and European TV regularly, followed by the success of "Run Runaway". As the album was originally to be released in February 1984, plans for a major concert tour had been discussed. However, the tour never took place and after a few concerts in America during 1984, the band would never perform live again, except for a one-song performance at the band's 25th Anniversary party, organised by the fan club.

== Critical reception ==
Professional ratings
Review scores
Source	Rating
AllMusic	2/5 stars
Number One	3/5 stars
Record Mirror	5/5 stars
Smash Hits	5/10 stars
Sounds	4.5/5 stars

Upon its release, Chris Welch of Kerrang! described The Amazing Kamikaze Syndrome as "all very loud, fast and boisterous" and noted that the range of tracks show the band "bent on proving anything the newer boys can do, they can do better". He also praised the "sharp production", for which he felt Lea should be "congratulated [for] getting a modern ambient sound – a cross between Japan and Led Zeppelin", and the "sort of links and programming that hasn't been attempted much since the days of Sgt. Pepper". Robin Smith of Record Mirror called it as "no nonsense stuff to leave you with a throb in your pinkies and a wide smile" and "breathtaking entertainment guaranteed". Sounds commented that the album "shows conclusively that Slade are still capable of rocking harder and catchier than most bands half their age." They added: "They sound so lively and confident you can forgive them the rock 'n' roll clichés they occasionally slip into. As always it's the hell-raisin' metal-boogie stomps that really shake the timbers, and there's enough big stampers here to keep Quiet Riot in hits till 1987!"

Music Week praised it as a "triumphal return to commercial success with engines screaming" and added: "The old Slade wall of sound is still made of best British brick, and Noddy could give any HM prize vocalist a run for his money." Ray King of Manchester Evening News said that it is a "real killer of an album from the champions of good-time pile-driving rock". Roger Trapp, writing for the Birmingham Evening Mail, remarked that most of the album is "in the time-honoured Slade style, with dense, power-saw soundalike guitars and raunchy vocals in the ascendancy". Denis Kilcommons of the Huddersfield Daily Examiner praised it as a "terrific album from a bunch of professionals playing better than ever and enjoying themselves".

Anne Lambert of Number One commented: "Slade still carry the same sound – enormous distorted guitars topped by Noddy belting it out for dear life. It will be cherished by Slade fanatics, and tolerated by everyone else." Linda Duff of Smash Hits said: "On which Four Lads set out to make as big a racket as possible. And with drums that sound like sacks of hobnail boots being chucked down long stairways, violin solos that career dangerously in and out of tune plus steamy guitars that tend to race along, they succeed very well. I wouldn't contemplate life by it, but it's a laff, inn'it?"

In a retrospective review, Jeff Giles of Ultimate Classic Rock described the album as a "well-written and smartly polished set of songs that topped off the band's rock sound with pop production perfectly in step with current trends."

== Track listing ==
All tracks are written by Noddy Holder and Jim Lea.

Side one
No.	Title	Length
1.	"Slam the Hammer Down"	3:25
2.	"In the Doghouse"	2:44
3.	"Run Runaway"	5:00
4.	"High and Dry"	3:10
5.	"My Oh My"	4:12
6.	"Cocky Rock Boys (Rule O.K.)"	3:27

Side two
No.	Title	Length
7.	"Ready to Explode"	8:38
8.	"(And Now the Waltz) C'est La Vie"	3:43
9.	"Cheap 'n' Nasty Luv"	3:27
10.	"Razzle Dazzle Man"	4:39

2007 Remastered edition bonus tracks
No.	Title	Length
11.	"Keep Your Hands Off My Power Supply" (B-side of "My Oh My")	3:34
12.	"My Oh My" (12" Extended Version)	5:34
13.	"Don't Tame a Hurricane" (B-side of "My Oh My" 12")	2:33
14.	"Run Runaway" (12" Extended Version)	5:26
15.	"Two Track Stereo, One Track Mind" (B-side of "Run Runaway")	2:55
16.	"Slam the Hammer Down" (Hotter Mix), (B-side of "Slam the Hammer Down" promo single)	3:44

2023 Remastered edition bonus tracks
No.	Title	Length
17.	"Run Runaway" (7" Version)	3:41
18.	"Slam the Hammer Down" (Hot Mix)	2:49

== Song information ==
"Slam the Hammer Down" would be released in America as a promotional single in 1984, remixed by Shep Pettibone. In "Cocky Rock Boys (Rule O.K.)", the line "you Frank and Johnny, you're hurting my arm" is heard at the end of the song, which is a reference to the 1941 film The Maltese Falcon, starring Humphrey Bogart. "Ready to Explode" is an eight-and-half-minute, multi-themed song about the excitement of motor racing.

== Personnel ==
Slade

- Noddy Holder – lead vocals, rhythm guitar
- Dave Hill – lead guitar, backing vocals
- Jim Lea – bass, electric violin, keyboards, guitars, backing vocals, lead vocal on verses (track 7), producer
- Don Powell – drums, percussion, gongs

Additional personnel

- Andy Dummit – saxophone (track 2)
- Pete Drummond – announcements (track 7)
- John Punter – producer (tracks 3, 5)
- Andy Miller, Dave Garland – engineers (tracks 1–2, 4, 6–10)
- Mike Nocito, Pete Schwier – engineers (tracks 3, 5)
- Andrew Christian – art direction
- Shoot That Tiger! – design
- John Shaw – photography
- Phil Davis – set designer

== Charts ==
Chart (1983–84)	Peak position
Australian Albums (Kent Music Report)	50
Austrian Albums (Ö3 Austria)	17
Finnish Albums (Suomen virallinen lista)	20
German Albums (Offizielle Top 100)	9
New Zealand Albums (RMNZ)	39
Norwegian Albums (VG-lista)	2
Swedish Albums (Sverigetopplistan)	1
Swiss Albums (Schweizer Hitparade)	5
UK Albums (OCC)	49
UK Heavy Metal Albums (MRIB)	2

Chart (2023)	Peak position
Scottish Albums (OCC)	35
UK Independent Albums (OCC)	18
UK Rock & Metal Albums (OCC)	10
