= The Genesis of Slade =

Compilation album by Slade
- Released: 3 March 1996; June 2000 (Cherry Red release)
- Genre: Rock
- Length: 62:41
- Label: The Music Corporation (1996); Cherry Red (2000)

Slade chronology
The Slade Collection Vol. 2, 79-87 (1993)	The Genesis of Slade (1996)	Feel the Noize – Greatest Hits (1997)

The Genesis of Slade is a compilation album of pre-Slade era recordings by British rock band Slade. It was first released in 1996 by The Music Corporation and was later re-issued by Cherry Red in 2000.

Compiled by John Haxby, The Genesis of Slade is the complete collection of 25 pre-Slade recordings ranging from 1964 to 1966. It features studio recordings by The Vendors (tracks 1–4), Steve Brett & the Mavericks (track 5–11), The 'N Betweens (Mk. 1) (tracks 12–19) and The 'N Betweens (Mk. 2) (tracks 20–25).

== Recordings ==
The first four tracks were recorded by The Vendors in June 1964, featuring Dave Hill on guitar and Don Powell on drums. They appeared on a privately pressed extended play. The seven tracks by Steve Brett & The Mavericks were recorded in 1965 and featured Noddy Holder on guitar and backing vocals. Six of the songs were featured across three singles, released by EMI's Columbia label, while "Hurting Inside" was unreleased at the time. The 'N Betweens (Mk. 1) recorded eight tracks in 1965, featuring Hill and Powell. Four were pressed onto a private acetate and the other four were released extended play by Barclay. The 'N Betweens (Mk. 2) was made up of the four members that would later form Slade. All six songs were recorded in 1966. "Security" was released as a promotional single in America by Highland Records, while "You Better Run" was released as a UK single by Columbia. The compilation's last three tracks were recorded by the band with Kim Fowley, but were unreleased at the time.

One omission from the pre-Slade recordings is the 1967 unreleased recording "Delighted to See You". Produced by Norman Smith, the song first surfaced on the 1994 various artists compilation Psychedelia at Abbey Road - 1965 to 1969. The compilation's Cherry Red re-issue accidentally omitted "Hurting Inside", although it was listed as a track on the album.

== Track listing ==
No.	Title	Writer(s)	Length
1.	"Don't Leave Me Now"	Dave Hill, John Howells	1:43
2.	"Twilight Time"	Artie Dunn, Al Nevins, Buck Ram	3:20
3.	"Take Your Time"	Norman Petty, Buddy Holly	1:55
4.	"Peace Pipe"	Norrie Paramor	2:20
5.	"Wishing"	Steve Brett	2:46
6.	"Anything That's Part of You"	Don Robertson	2:09
7.	"Sad, Lonely & Blue"	Brett	2:27
8.	"Candy"	A. Dalley	2:35
9.	"Chains On My Heart"	Brett	2:50
10.	"Sugar Shack"	Keith McCormack, B. Faye Voss	2:56
11.	"Hurting Inside"		2:16
12.	"Can Your Monkey Do the Dog"	Steve Cropper, Rufus Thomas, Jr.	2:33
13.	"Respectable"		2:13
14.	"I Wish You Would"	Billy Boy Arnold	2:44
15.	"Ooh Poo Pa Doo"	Jessie Hill	3:04
16.	"Feel So Fine"	Leonard Lee	1:54
17.	"Take a Heart"	Miki Dallon	2:56
18.	"Little Nightingale"	Jimmy Page	2:43
19.	"You Don't Believe Me"	Merrell, Page, Bobby Graham, Phil May	2:08
20.	"Security"	Otis Redding	2:37
21.	"You Better Run"	Felix Cavaliere, Edward Brigatti, Jr	2:34
22.	"Evil Witchman"	Kim Fowley, Don Powell, Hill, Noddy Holder, Jim Lea	2:14
23.	"Hold Tight"	Ken Howard, Alan Blaikley	2:37
24.	"Ugly Girl"	Fowley, Powell, Hill, Holder, Lea	2:17
25.	"Need"		1:57

== Critical reception ==
Professional ratings
Review scores
Source	Rating
AllMusic	2.5/5 stars
Record Collector	mixed

Richie Unterberger of AllMusic said: "The idea behind this compilation is one that's extremely useful to Slade fans trying to track down rarities recorded by groups in which the members played prior to Ambrose Slade's formation in the late '60s. This 24-track CD includes all of them. Still, the overused cliché "of historical interest only" applies here, although some of the 'N Betweens tracks are fairly decent. The Vendors' EP is dominated by just-professional oldies covers. The Steve Brett & the Mavericks singles are pretty limp and corny mainstream pop/rockers heavily influenced by Elvis Presley ballads and sub-Elvis British crooners like Adam Faith. The first lineup of the 'N Betweens boasted a far tougher R&B-rock British Invasion sound, but most of the tunes here are far below the standards of the Yardbirds, the Pretty Things, and the like. Best of all on the disc, though not great by any means, are the two 1966 singles by the 'N Betweens' second lineup, which are fair but not very imaginative period British soul-blues-rock."

In 2000, Record Collector said: "Like most acts who hit it big in the early 70s, the members of Slade had flailed around in the soft white underbelly of the mid-60s British music scene before finally discovering their own voice. This reissued collection assembles 25 tracks cut by three pre-Slade acts to provide what is, undoubtedly, an essential document for Slade obsessives. Unfortunately, it's far from essential for the rest of us."

== Personnel ==
The Vendors

- John Howells - vocals
- Mick Marson - rhythm guitar
- Dave Hill - lead guitar
- Billy Diffey - bass
- Don Powell - drums

Steve Brett & the Mavericks

- Steve Brett - vocals, guitar
- Phil Burnell - rhythm guitar
- Noddy Holder - guitar, backing vocals
- Terry Taylor - saxophone
- Pete Bickley - bass
- Gerry Kibble - drums

The 'N Betweens (Mk. 1)

- John Howells - vocals
- Mick Marson - rhythm guitar
- Dave Hill - lead guitar
- Dave 'Cass' Jones - bass
- Don Powell - drums

The 'N Betweens (Mk. 2)

- Noddy Holder - vocals, guitar
- Dave Hill - lead guitar
- Jim Lea - bass
- Don Powell - drums

The Genesis of Slade

- John Haxby - compiled by, sleeve
- John Howells - liner notes
- David Johnston, Max Howarth - remastering
