= (And Now the Waltz) C'est La Vie =

- UK/European cover of "(And Now the Waltz) C'est La Vie".

Single by Slade

from the album The Amazing Kamikaze Syndrome
- B-side: "Merry Xmas Everybody (Live & Kickin')"
- Released: 8 November 1982
- Genre: Rock
- Length: 3:43
- Label: RCA
- Songwriters: Noddy Holder; Jim Lea
- Producer: Jim Lea

Slade singles chronology
"Rock and Roll Preacher (Hallelujah I'm on Fire)" (1982)	"(And Now the Waltz) C'est La Vie" (1982)	"My Oh My" (1983)

Audio sample
- file; help

"(And Now the Waltz) C'est La Vie" is a song by English rock band Slade, released on 8 November 1982 as the lead single from the band's eleventh studio album, The Amazing Kamikaze Syndrome and also included on its 1984 North American counterpart, Keep Your Hands Off My Power Supply. The song was written by lead vocalist Noddy Holder and bassist Jim Lea, and was produced by Lea. "(And Now the Waltz) C'est La Vie" reached number 50 in the UK Singles Chart and remained in the top 100 for seven weeks.

== Background ==
Slade started recording their second studio album for RCA in 1982, and in November that year, the album's first single, "(And Now the Waltz) C'est La Vie", was released. Attempting to appeal to the Christmas market, it reached No. 50 in the UK, but fared better in Poland, reaching No. 2 there in January 1983, while also reaching No. 29 on Radio Luxembourg's chart. As the song was not the big UK hit that both the band and RCA hoped for, the new album The Amazing Kamikaze Syndrome would not be released until December 1983. At the beginning of the year, RCA told the band that the album lacked potential chart hits and in the effort to amend that, the label hired producer John Punter to work on two new tracks "My Oh My" and "Run Runaway", both of which would go on to become big hits in 1983–84.

"(And Now the Waltz) C'est La Vie" was described by Holder as a "sentimental love song". In a 1983 interview with Sounds, Lea said of the song: "We thought it was a ballad but when Dave Lee Travis played it, he said "That's Slade and now for a ballad" and put Lionel Ritchie on and then we realised ours wasn't a ballad at all. It came over like four idiots trying to tear their way out of the speakers." Holder also told Sounds in 1983: "It looked as if it was going to be quite a big hit but unfortunately it didn't get much above #50 in the charts."

In 2005, Holder appeared on his regular TV-reviewing slot on the BBC Radio 2 show The Radcliffe and Maconie Show. Asked to choose a track from the band's new compilation album The Very Best of Slade, Holder chose "(And Now the Waltz) C'est La Vie". He felt the track, although not one of Slade's best-known singles, showed off his voice really well.

== Promotion ==
No music video was filmed to promote the single. In the UK, the band performed the song on the ITV children's music show Razzmatazz. In December, Slade embarked on a UK tour, which promoted the single and the newly released Slade on Stage album.

== Critical reception ==
Upon its release, Malcolm Dome of Kerrang! remarked, "'C'est La Vie' sees Slade returning to the balladic format of 'Everyday', with a swaying, soothing tune that immediately buries itself in the wallet. However, the old gutsy punch of da boyzz is, thankfully, never far from the surface. An indispensable buy." Geoff Barton, writing for Sounds, described it as a "splendid single". He called "C'est La Vie" a "highly dramatic ballad", with its "sweeping, over-produced grandeur superbly counterbalanced by Nod's gruff vocal sensitivity", and the live version of "Merry Xmas Everybody" on the B-side as "festive fury at its finest".

== Formats ==
7-inch single (UK, Germany, the Netherlands and Australia)

1. "(And Now the Waltz) C'est La Vie" – 3:44
2. "Merry Xmas Everybody" (Live & Kickin') – 4:03

== Personnel ==
Slade

- Noddy Holder – lead vocals, guitar
- Jim Lea – piano, organ, bass, backing vocals
- Dave Hill – lead guitar, backing vocals
- Don Powell – drums

Production

- Jim Lea – production ("(And Now the Waltz) C'est La Vie")
- Slade – production ("Merry Xmas Everybody")

== Charts ==
Chart (1982)	Peak position
UK Singles Chart (OCC)	50
UK Top 100 Singles (Record Business)	43
UK Heavy Metal Singles (MRIB)	7
