= Run Runaway =

1984 single by Slade

Single by Slade

from the album The Amazing Kamikaze Syndrome and Keep Your Hands Off My Power Supply
- B-side: "Two Track Stereo One Track Mind"
- Released: 13 January 1984
- Genre: Pop metal; Celtic rock
- Length: 5:00 (album version); 3:42 (single version); 5:26 (12-inch version)
- Label: RCA
- Songwriters: Noddy Holder; Jim Lea
- Producer: John Punter

Slade singles chronology
"My Oh My" (1983)	"Run Runaway" (1984)	"Slam the Hammer Down" (1984)

Audio sample
- file; help

Audio
- "Run Runaway" on YouTube

"Run Runaway" is a song by British rock band Slade, released in 1984 as the third single from the band's 11th studio album, The Amazing Kamikaze Syndrome, and as the lead single from the album's US counterpart, Keep Your Hands Off My Power Supply. The song was written by lead vocalist Noddy Holder and bassist Jim Lea and produced by John Punter. It reached No. 7 in the United Kingdom and was the band's first (and only) top-20 hit in the United States, where it reached No. 20.

== Background ==
Having recorded much of The Amazing Kamikaze Syndrome in 1982, Slade's label, RCA Records, felt the album lacked chart potential and in the effort to amend that, RCA suggested the band work with producer John Punter. Holder and Lea then wrote and demoed two songs; "My Oh My" and "Run Runaway". Both were received with enthusiasm by RCA and Punter was hired to work on the two tracks. With the UK/European success of "My Oh My" in late 1983, The Amazing Kamikaze Syndrome was rush-released by RCA in December.

"Run Runaway", described by Holder as "a rocky Scottish jig", features Lea on electric fiddle. In a 1984 interview, Holder said: "We always wanted to do a jig with the old violin going and that. We decided to go in and put a sort of rock beat behind an old Scottish jig." In a 1986 fan club interview, Lea revealed that he had come up with the song's melody while holding a conversation with someone. The song bears melodic and structural similarities to the 19th century hymn "There Is a Happy Land".

== Release ==
"Run Runaway" was released on 7-inch and 12-inch vinyl by RCA Records in the UK, Ireland, across Europe, Australia, New Zealand and Japan. It was released by CBS in the United States and Canada. The B-side on all RCA versions of the single was "Two Track Stereo, One Track Mind", which was exclusive to the single and would later appear on the band's 2007 compilation B-Sides. On the CBS releases, "Don't Tame a Hurricane" appeared as the B-side, which would be included as an album track on Keep Your Hands Off My Power Supply. The 12-inch vinyl, released in the UK and Germany, featured an extended version of "Run Runaway" as the A-side.

== Promotion ==
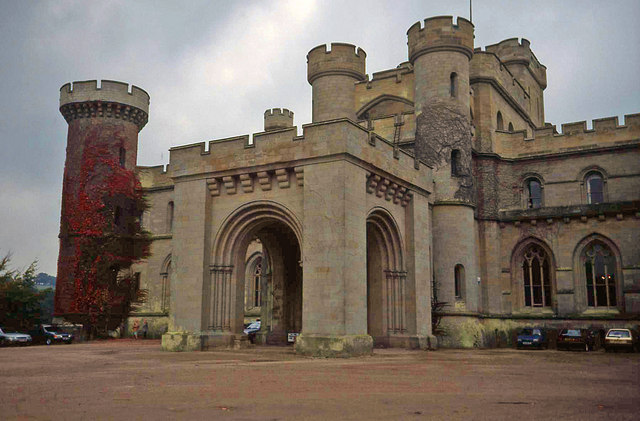
Front entrance of Eastnor Castle in 1992

In the UK, the band performed the song on the TV music show Top of the Pops, while performances were filmed at the Hall of Fame and Rhyl Sun Centre. The band also performed the song at the 1984 Montreux Festival and on German and Swedish TV. In America, the song was performed on American Bandstand and The Dance Show.

A music video was filmed to promote the single, which was directed by Tim Pope for GLO Productions. It was shot at Eastnor Castle in Ledbury, Herefordshire. The video featured the band performing the song in front of an audience dressed in tartan. Other sequences showed a marching bagpipe band and a kilted Scot (Ron Tarr) grappling with a caber. The video was a big success in America, where it received constant showing on MTV.

== Critical reception ==
Upon its release as a single, Radio Luxembourg DJ Mike Hollis, writing for the Daily Mirror, stated, "Slade are back – and how! A tremendous single. I reckon the boys are set for a great 1984." Tommy Vance, reviewing for Kerrang!, praised it as a "good single" and added, "I know for a fact that this is based on a traditional tune or melody – I just can't remember which one. This is very cleverly done, however, and the sound is great." Bill Black of Sounds noted the song was reminiscent of both Big Country and Thin Lizzy. He wrote, "Nobody's denying Slade their comeback, but on the backs of Big Country? Not quite. [They] take it one stage further and slip in amongst the 'Harvest Home' histrionics a passing reference to BC's biggest influence – Thin Lizzy circa 'Whiskey in the Jar'. Thus right in the middle of the song Slade slay us with a quick jig before launching back into the bagpipe guitars etc. So cheeky it's charming." In a retrospective review by AllMusic, Dave Thompson described "Run Runaway" as "storming" and wrote, "Building on the anthemic power of the earlier 'My Oh My', 'Run Runaway' is raucous chanting, swirling guitars, wild violin, and even a taste of heavy metal bagpipes, helped along by a drum sound that is pure early '80s."

== Chart performance ==
In January 1984, "Run Runaway" was released as the album's third single and reached No. 7 on the UK Singles Chart. The 1983 success of Quiet Riot's version of Slade's 1973 UK chart-topper "Cum On Feel the Noize" led to Slade signing with CBS Associated Records for their first American record deal since the 1970s. The label soon repackaged The Amazing Kamikaze Syndrome into Keep Your Hands Off My Power Supply and released "Run Runaway" as the lead single in March 1984. With surging interest in the band and a music video benefiting from heavy play on MTV, "Run Runaway" was Slade's breakthrough hit in the United States and would remain the band's biggest success there; it peaked at No. 20 on the Billboard Hot 100 and reached No. 1 on the Billboard Rock Top Tracks chart.

== Track listings ==
7-inch single (RCA release)

1. "Run Runaway" – 3:43
2. "Two Track Stereo, One Track Mind" – 2:54

7-inch single (CBS release)

1. "Run Runaway" – 3:43
2. "Don't Tame a Hurricane" – 2:33

12-inch single (UK/German release)

1. "Run Runaway" – 5:26
2. "Two Track Stereo, One Track Mind" – 2:52

== Personnel ==
Slade

- Noddy Holder – lead vocals, rhythm guitar
- Jim Lea – electric violin, bass, backing vocals, producer of "Two Track Stereo, One Track Mind" and "Don't Tame a Hurricane"
- Dave Hill – lead guitar, backing vocals
- Don Powell – drums

Additional personnel

- John Punter – producer of "Run Runaway"
- Mike Nocito, Pete Schwier – engineers on "Run Runaway"
- Shoot That Tiger! – design
- Andrew Christian – art direction

== Charts ==
=== Weekly charts ===
Chart (1984)	Peak position
Australia (Kent Music Report)	17
Belgium (Ultratop 50 Flanders)	33
Canada Top Singles (RPM)	13
Europe (European Top 100 Singles)	13
Iceland (RÚV)	1
Ireland (IRMA)	8
New Zealand (Recorded Music NZ)	21
Norway (VG-lista)	7
Sweden (Sverigetopplistan)	4
UK Singles (Official Charts)	7
UK Heavy Metal Singles (MRIB)	2
US Billboard Hot 100	20
US Mainstream Rock (Billboard)	1
US Cash Box Top 100 Singles	20
US AOR Hot Tracks (Radio & Records)	2
US Contemporary Hit Radio (Radio & Records)	18
West Germany (GfK)	19

=== Year-end charts ===
Chart (1984)	Position
Australia (Kent Music Report)	69
Canada Top Singles (RPM)	84
UK Singles (Gallup)	94

== Cover versions ==
- In 1986, Czech singer Petra Janů released a Czech-language cover version titled "My Chceme gól" (We want goal), with new, association football-themed lyrics.
- In 1993, Polish band Acid Drinkers recorded a cover on their album Fishdick.
- In 1995, Canadian band Great Big Sea recorded a cover of the song as the opening track for their album Up.
- Also in 1995, Canadian band Captain Tractor used the melody and chorus in their song Lord of the Dance on their album East of Edson.
- In 2000, Eurodance group Dominoo released an EP with four different versions of the song.
- In 2001, Bart Foley recorded a version of the song for the compilation Slade Remade: A Tribute to Slade.
- In 2001, Off Kilter released a version of the song on their album Etched in Stone.
- In 2007, Swedish techno-country group Rednex recorded a cover of the song.
- In 2007, Celtic rock band Prydein recorded a cover of the song on their album Loud Pipes.

== See also ==
- List of Billboard Mainstream Rock number-one songs of the 1980s
