= My Oh My (Slade song) =

1983 single by Slade

Single by Slade

from the album The Amazing Kamikaze Syndrome and Keep Your Hands Off My Power Supply
- B-side: "Keep Your Hands off My Power Supply"; "Don't Tame a Hurricane"
- Released: 4 November 1983
- Length: 4:12 (single/album version); 5:34 (12-inch version)
- Label: RCA
- Songwriters: Noddy Holder; Jim Lea
- Producer: John Punter

Slade singles chronology
"(And Now the Waltz) C'est La Vie" (1982)	"My Oh My" (1983)	"Run Runaway" (1984)

Audio sample
- file; help

Alternative Cover
- Japanese cover of "My Oh My".

"My Oh My" is a song by British rock band Slade, released in November 1983 as the second single from the band's 11th studio album, The Amazing Kamikaze Syndrome, and in 1984 as the second single from the album's US counterpart, Keep Your Hands Off My Power Supply. The song was written by lead vocalist Noddy Holder and bassist Jim Lea and produced by John Punter. "My Oh My" reached No. 2 on the UK Singles Chart, topped the charts of Norway and Sweden, and peaked at No. 37 on the US Billboard Hot 100.

== Background ==
The idea for the melody of "My Oh My" came to Lea while the band were in the dressing room prior to a concert in Wales. Listening to Holder and guitarist Dave Hill tuning up. Lea later recalled: "It reminded me of bagpipes. I wrote the melody in my head to the drone of the strings." In a 1987 fan club interview, Hill chose "My Oh My" as his favourite Slade single: "Although I didn't like "My Oh My" when I first heard it, by the time I started playing on it and promoting it, I discovered a certain magic and hidden power in it."

Having recorded much of The Amazing Kamikaze Syndrome in 1982, Slade's label, RCA Records felt the album lacked chart potential. In the effort to amend that, RCA suggested the band work with producer John Punter. Holder and Lea then wrote and demoed two songs: "My Oh My" and "Run Runaway". Both were received with enthusiasm by RCA and Punter was hired to produce the two tracks. They were recorded in September and October 1983. The band protested against RCA's plans to rush release "My Oh My" as a single in November 1983 as they feared it would get lost in the Christmas rush, but RCA insisted on its release ahead of the new year.

== Release ==
"My Oh My" was released on 7-inch and 12-inch vinyl by RCA Records in the UK, Ireland, across Europe, Brazil, Mexico, South Africa, Australia, New Zealand and Japan. It was released by CBS in America and Canada. The B-side on all RCA versions of the single was "Keep Your Hands Off My Power Supply", which was originally exclusive to the single. The 12-inch vinyl, released in the UK, Germany and Mexico, featured an extended version of "My Oh My" as the A-side and a second B-side "Don't Tame a Hurricane", which again was initially exclusive to the single. Both B-sides would appear as album tracks on the Keep Your Hands Off My Power Supply album. On the CBS releases, the album track "High and Dry" appeared as the B-side. In the UK, a limited edition 7-inch vinyl was also released, containing an additional track "Merry Xmas Everybody (Live & Kickin')", which had previously appeared as the B-side to the band's 1982 single "(And Now the Waltz) C'est La Vie".

== Promotion ==
In the UK, the band performed the song on various TV shows, including Top of the Pops, The Saturday Show, The Russell Harty Show, Saturday Superstore and David Frost's End of the Year Show. In February 1984, the band mimed the song at the BBC British Rock and Pop Awards. For its 1984 release in America, the band performed the song on American Bandstand.

A music video was filmed to promote the American release of the single. It was directed by Keith Coe and shot in London. The video depicts Slade walking in the countryside and one by one get picked up by an articulated lorry driven by a racing driver, which has an open stage on the back. The band are seen performing the song on the lorry, which arrives at Surrey Docks for a concert, where schoolchildren are seen waving Slade scarves, the lorry driver joins the band on stage, takes their crash helmet off and reveals themselves to be a beautiful woman. Like the "Run Runaway" video, "My Oh My" received regular airings on MTV.

== Critical reception ==
Upon its release, Martin Knight of Kerrang! noted, "Noddy and the lads attempt to out-chant Queen's 'We Are the Champions' and might very well succeed if this gets the airplay." He noted that the "slow and ultimately simplistic" song "builds nicely to a rousing finale that should have them waving their scarves on the terraces by Christmas". Knight also praised John Punter's "clean and uncluttered" production, which he felt made the song "positively intimate compared to their last few offerings which sounded as if they were recorded in an aircraft hangar". Jools Holland, as guest reviewer for Smash Hits, remarked that "My Oh My" "sounds like a slowed-down version of 'She'll Be Coming 'Round the Mountain' with a football team singing at the end". He added that it was "undoubtedly aimed at the Christmas market" and "has no hint of the old Slade".

In the US, Billboard called "My Oh My" a "tuneful, love-your-fellow-man anthem, aswash in power chords", with "the irrepressibly cheerful Noddy Holder joined by what sounds like a whole football team of singalong choristers". Cash Box noted that "melody takes the driver's seat with a heartfelt lead vocal and piano intro that leads into Slade's classic power-rock sound". They added, "The choral vocal and heavy drum backbeat again prove that this group is not one to be messed with." CMJ New Music Report called it "a terrific drinking song".

== Chart performance ==
"My Oh My" was released in the United Kingdom on 4 November 1983 and reached No. 2 on the UK Singles Chart the following month. Following the European success of "My Oh My", The Amazing Kamikaze Syndrome was rush-released by RCA in December. In January 1984, "My Oh My" was certified gold in the UK by the British Phonographic Industry (BPI). In Sweden, the song topped the chart and was awarded a platinum certifications for shipments in excess of 50,000.

The 1983 success of Quiet Riot's version of Slade's 1973 UK chart topper "Cum On Feel the Noize" led to Slade signing with CBS Associated Records for their first American record deal since the 1970s. The label soon repackaged The Amazing Kamikaze Syndrome into Keep Your Hands Off My Power Supply and released "Run Runaway" as the lead single in March 1984. It was Slade's breakthrough hit in America, reaching No. 20, and was followed in June by "My Oh My". It gave the band their second and last top-40 hit there, peaking at No. 37 on the Billboard Hot 100 and No. 32 on the Billboard Rock Top Tracks chart.

== Swing version ==
In 1985, a swing-style version of the song was recorded, which appeared as the B-side to the band's 1985 single "Do You Believe in Miracles". The version was recorded by the Monty Babson Big Band with Holder adding his vocals to it. In a 1986 fan club interview, Holder spoke of the version:

"It came about originally because a few people asked us for demos of songs to cover. A lot of people wanted to cover "My Oh My". I mean 'middle of the road' sort of people. Colin Newman actually suggested it, saying we couldn't send them our own version, because they've all heard that. Anyway, we had people like Frank Sinatra saying that we ought to do a 'swing version' of it. Well, we weren't going to do it, so we got a mate of ours – Monty Babson – to sing it on the original demo, which went out to all these 'middle of the road' people. When I heard it, I really liked it, so I said "Why don't we put my voice with Monty Babson's band?" and that's what we did. I just had a couple of drinks in the pub and went and sang with him in one take. We didn't spend any time on it or anything."

== Track listings ==
7-inch single (RCA release)

1. "My Oh My" – 4:09
2. "Keep Your Hands Off My Power Supply" – 3:34

7-inch single (UK limited edition)

1. "My Oh My" – 4:09
2. "Merry Xmas Everybody (Live & Kickin')" – 3:28
3. "Keep Your Hands Off My Power Supply" – 3:34

7-inch single (CBS release)

1. "My Oh My" – 4:09
2. "High and Dry" – 3:10

12-inch single (RCA release)

1. "My Oh My" – 5:30
2. "Keep Your Hands Off My Power Supply" – 3:34
3. "Don't Tame a Hurricane" – 2:30

== Personnel ==
Slade

- Noddy Holder – lead vocals, guitar
- Jim Lea – piano, synthesizer, bass, backing vocals, producer of all B-Sides
- Dave Hill – lead guitar, backing vocals
- Don Powell – drums

Additional personnel

- John Punter – producer of "My Oh My"
- Mike Nocito, Pete Schwier – engineers on "My Oh My"
- Shoot That Tiger! – design
- Pete Turner – photography

== Charts ==
=== Weekly charts ===
Chart (1983–1984)	Peak position
Australia (Kent Music Report)	65
Austria (Ö3 Austria Top 40)	5
Belgium (Ultratop 50 Flanders)	4
Canada Top Singles (RPM)	31
Finland (Suomen virallinen lista)	27
Ireland (IRMA)	3
Netherlands (Dutch Top 40)	8
Netherlands (Single Top 100)	9
Norway (VG-lista)	1
South Africa (Springbok Radio)	9
Sweden (Sverigetopplistan)	1
Switzerland (Schweizer Hitparade)	2
UK Singles (Official Charts)	2
UK Heavy Metal Singles (MRIB)	1
US Billboard Hot 100	37
US Mainstream Rock (Billboard)	32
US Cash Box Top 100 Singles	37
US AOR Hot Tracks (Radio & Records)	58
US Contemporary Hit Radio (Radio & Records)	30
West Germany (GfK)	4

=== Year-end charts ===
Chart (1983)	Position
UK Singles (OCC)	65

Chart (1984)	Position
Belgium (Ultratop)	77
Switzerland (Schweizer Hitparade)	18
West Germany (Media Control)	28

== Certifications ==
Region	Certification	Certified units/sales
Sweden (GLF)	Platinum	50,000^{^}
United Kingdom (BPI)	Gold	500,000^{^}
^{^} Shipments figures based on certification alone.

== Cover versions ==
- In 1984, Swedish dansband Ingmar Nordströms recorded an instrumental version featuring saxophone for their album Saxparty 11.
- In 1984, German "NDW-band" Combo Colossale released a German version "Eis und Feuer (My-Oh-My)" on Repertoire Records.
- In 1985, the song was parodied by American comedian Joe Piscopo on his album New Jersey. Imitating U.S. talk host David Letterman, he sings "We're having some fun now, my, oh my. We're having more fun now than humans should be allowed... phone the neighbors, wake the kids..."
- In 1995, Norwegian band Hurra Torpedo recorded a cover for their single "Stockholm".
- In 1996, German rock band Extrabreit released a cover of the song on their album Jeden Tag – Jede Nacht. The song was titled "Das Ruder" and featured extra writing credit to Kai Havaii and Stefan Kleinkrieg for the German lyrics.
- In 1998, techno duo Southern Cross recorded their own version of the track on the single "Running".
- In 2000, German singer Frank Schöbel recorded a version of the song.
- In 2003, Reggae singer John Holt recorded his own version of the song for the compilation album Trojan Christmas Box Set.
- In 2004, Irish singer Tabby Callaghan covered the song on the first series of The X Factor. The following year saw him record the song as the B-Side to his single "Number One".
- In 2009, German musician Frank Zander & German singer Frank Schöbel recorded a version of the song and titled it "Wir Gehören Zusammen". The song was released as a single.
