= Wall of Hits (video) =

- Directed by: Peter Ponton
- Produced by: Kim Turberville
- Starring: Noddy Holder, Dave Hill, Jim Lea, Don Powell
- Music by: Slade
- Distributed by: Polygram Video
- Release date: 11 November 1991
- Running time: 55:00
- Country: United Kingdom
- Language: English

Wall of Hits is the first video compilation by the British rock band Slade. Titled after the compilation album of the same name, Wall of Hits was released on VHS by Polygram Video in 1991.

== Background ==
In 1991, Slade's former 1970s label Polydor Records approached the band with the idea of recording two new singles to promote a new compilation album Wall of Hits. The two singles, "Radio Wall of Sound" and "Universe", were soon completed, with the former being released in October 1991. It reached No. 21 in the UK and was followed in November by the release of Wall of Hits, which reached No. 34 and was certified UK Silver by BPI. Alongside the compilation album was the release of the band's first video collection. All of the footage from the VHS was later included on the band's 2005 DVD compilation The Very Best of Slade.

The video compilation contains sixteen music videos, spanning from 1971 to 1991. Between the videos, new interviews with all four members of the band gave background details on the songs and the videos. The opening segment of the video features behind-the-scenes footage of the video for "Radio Wall of Sound". Although most of the included videos were music videos, two were TV performances. "Coz I Luv You" was performed on the German TV show Beat Club, while the footage of "Merry Xmas Everybody" is the band's performance of the song on Top of the Pops in 1983. Although "How Does It Feel" was listed on the back cover as being included on the compilation, there is no actual footage of the song. Instead, part of the song is played in the background while the band talk about their 1975 film Slade in Flame. The same applied to "Mama Weer All Crazee Now" which is only partly played over the closing credits of the compilation. The video of "Them Kind of Monkeys Can't Swing" is taken from Slade in Flame.

As some of the band's hits from the 1970s had no music videos, tracks such as "Cum On Feel the Noize", "Look Wot You Dun", "Take Me Bak 'Ome" and "Skweeze Me, Pleeze Me" are not featured. Also, much of the band's 1980s music videos are missing, with the exception of "My Oh My" and "Run Runaway". This was most likely due to the videos being made when the band were contracted to RCA rather than Polydor. The video for "Radio Wall of Sound" was included, but not "Universe" as the video had not been filmed.

== Video listing ==
1. "Coz I Luv You"
2. "Gudbuy T' Jane"
3. "My Friend Stan"
4. "How Does It Feel"
5. "Them Kind of Monkeys Can't Swing"
6. "Far Far Away"
7. "Thanks for the Memory (Wham Bam Thank You Mam)"
8. "Let's Call It Quits"
9. "Nobody's Fool"
10. "My Baby Left Me"
11. "Give Us a Goal"
12. "Merry Xmas Everybody"
13. "My Oh My"
14. "Run Runaway"
15. "Radio Wall of Sound"
16. "Mama Weer All Crazee Now"
