= Wall of Hits =

1991 compilation album by Slade

Compilation album by Slade
- Released: 11 November 1991
- Genre: Glam rock, hard rock
- Length: 76:31
- Label: Polydor
- Producer: Chas Chandler, John Punter, Jim Lea, Slade

Slade chronology
The Slade Collection 81–87 (1991)	Wall of Hits (1991)	The Slade Collection Vol. 2, 79–87 (1993)

Singles from Wall of Hits
- 1. "Radio Wall of Sound" Released: 7 October 1991; 2. "Universe" Released: 2 December 1991

Wall of Hits is a compilation album by the British rock band Slade. It was released on 11 November 1991 and reached No. 34 in the UK Albums Chart. The album was issued by Polydor and included the last two singles to be recorded by the band: "Radio Wall of Sound" and "Universe".

== Background ==
After the commercial failure of the band's 1987 album You Boyz Make Big Noize, and the end of their contract with RCA, Slade decided to take an eighteen-month break. Although the band announced their intentions to record a new album, these plans did not materialise and band activity remained limited. Later in 1991, the band's former 1970s label Polydor Records approached the band with the idea of recording two new singles to promote a new compilation album Wall of Hits. The two singles, "Radio Wall of Sound" and "Universe", were soon completed, with Polydor offering the option of a new studio album if both singles were successful. "Radio Wall of Sound" was released in October 1991 and reached No. 21 in the UK, earning the band their twenty-fourth Top 40 single and their first Top 40 hit since 1984.

Wall of Hits was then released in November and peaked at No. 34. It was certified UK Silver by BPI that month. A VHS of the same name was also released, featuring numerous music videos and filmed performances of the band's singles over their career. "Universe" was released in December to attract the Christmas market and further promote the compilation over the festive period. It failed to reach the top 75 and replicate the success of "Radio Wall of Sound", stalling at number 76. Polydor withdrew their option for a new studio album and the band split up in 1992.

The album contained twenty tracks covering the band's career from 1971 to 1991. However, some critics were quick to notice the omissions of a number of charting singles, including "In for a Penny, "We'll Bring the House Down", "All Join Hands" and "Myzsterious Mizster Jones". In a 1992 fan club interview, Holder spoke of the track selection on the compilation: "Something had to go to enable the inclusion of the two new tracks and the two RCA tracks which made it a good overall package, although we are not likely to get a volume two deal if the first volume doesn't do that well."

In a 1992 fan club interview, guitarist Dave Hill mentioned the compilation in a story of seeing Kiss live:

"A couple of weeks back, I went to see Kiss in concert at the NEC. It was good to see Gene and the band again, and as many fans will know, Kiss do admit to being influenced by the music of Slade. The joke of the night was that Kiss had sent out for Wall of Hits to play in the dressing room to get revved up before they went onstage! Gene said to me that he just wanted to check and see if he had nicked all the riffs correctly! It was good to have a chat and they gave a good show, lots of pyrotechnics and tons of noize, but yes, really nice to meet up with them again."

== Track listing ==
All tracks are written by Noddy Holder and Jim Lea except "Get Down and Get with It" by Bobby Marchan, "Look Wot You Dun" by Holder, Lea and Don Powell, and "Radio Wall of Sound" and "Universe" by Lea.

No.	Title	Length
1.	"Get Down and Get with It"	3:49
2.	"Coz I Luv You"	3:31
3.	"Look Wot You Dun"	2:50
4.	"Take Me Bak 'Ome"	3:12
5.	"Mama Weer All Crazee Now"	3:42
6.	"Gudbuy T'Jane"	3:31
7.	"Cum On Feel the Noize"	4:27
8.	"Skweeze Me, Pleeze Me"	4:27
9.	"My Friend Stan"	2:40
10.	"Everyday"	3:10
11.	"The Bangin' Man"	4:07
12.	"Far Far Away"	3:36
13.	"How Does It Feel" (not on LP)	5:54
14.	"Thanks for the Memory (Wham Bam Thank You Mam)" (not on LP)	4:34
15.	"Let's Call It Quits"	3:31
16.	"My Oh My"	4:11
17.	"Run Runaway"	3:42
18.	"Radio Wall of Sound"	3:46
19.	"Universe"	4:12
20.	"Merry Xmas Everybody"	3:24

== Critical reception ==
Professional ratings
Review scores
Source	Rating
AllMusic	4.5/5 stars
NME	10/10 (side one); 2/10 (side two)

Dave Thompson of AllMusic retrospectively wrote: "By no means the first (or last) ever Slade hits collection, Wall of Hits is nevertheless the only one you truly need, a solid roundup of every British Top Ten smash the band ever scored, plus a smattering of lesser-rated (but equally deserving) Top 20 entries, and only one track – 1991's "Universe" – that really doesn't belong. Neither has time taken any toll on the quality of the music. Whether causing roaring traffic to grind to a halt or bearing their souls in a ballad, the members of Slade not only made great records, they also tapped emotions that make fans never tire of singing their songs."

== Personnel ==
Slade

- Noddy Holder – lead vocals, rhythm guitar
- Dave Hill – lead guitar, backing vocals
- Jim Lea – bass, piano, violin, keyboards, backing vocals, producer (tracks 18–19)
- Don Powell – drums

Production

- Chas Chandler – producer (tracks 1–15, 20)
- John Punter – producer (tracks 16, 17)

== Charts ==
Chart (1991–1993)	Peak position
Dutch Albums (Album Top 100)	65
German Albums (Offizielle Top 100)	44
UK Albums (OCC)	34

== Certifications ==
Region	Certification	Certified units/sales
United Kingdom (BPI)	Silver	60,000^{^}
^{^} Shipments figures based on certification alone.
