= Didn't You Use to Use to Be You? =

1980 song by the Dummies

Single by The Dummies
- B-side: "Miles Out to Sea"
- Released: 1 September 1980
- Length: 3:25
- Label: Cheapskate
- Songwriters: Jim Lea; Noddy Holder
- Producer: Jim Lea

The Dummies singles chronology
"When the Lights Are Out" (1979)	"Didn't You Use to Use to Be You?" (1980)	"Maybe Tonite" (1981)

"Didn't You Use to Use to Be You?" is a song written by Jim Lea and Noddy Holder of Slade, and recorded by the Dummies, a musical project of Lea's and his brother, Frank. It was released by Cheapskate Records as a single on 1 September 1980 and later appeared on the 1992 compilation album A Day in the Life of the Dummies.

== Background ==
In 1979, Jim Lea and his brother Frank formed the Dummies at a time when the new releases from Lea's band Slade were facing chart failure and little interest from radio. Lea wanted to determine whether there was something wrong was his and Noddy Holder's songwriting or a general reluctance from DJs to play new Slade material. Lea recalled to Chris Charlesworth in 1984: "Slade were passé and couldn't get any radio play at all. I wanted to see whether I could get radio play on my own without people realising the Slade connection." The two brothers (later joined by Slade manager Chas Chandler) formed Cheapskate Records at the same time and the Dummies released their debut single, a cover of Slade's "When the Lights Are Out", in December 1979.

There were plans to release another Slade cover, "Nobody's Fool", as the next Dummies single, but this was scrapped in favour of releasing a new song penned by Lea and Holder specifically for the Dummies, "Didn't You Use to Use to Be You?". The song tells the story of Harry Higgins, a former pop star under the name Rocky Jones who is now a salesman. He continues to be recognised by people years later as a one-hit wonder and regrets how his time as a pop star proved to be short-lived. Lea came up with the music, the concept for the lyrics and the title, and Holder then wrote the lyrics based around Lea's idea. Frank Lea told the New Slade Fan Club in 1980, "I think the lyrics are some of the best that Nod has ever come up with, they're really good." The song featured Lea's wife Louise providing some of the lead vocals in the chorus.

== Release ==
"Didn't You Use to Use to Be You?" was released by Cheapskate, with distribution by RCA Records, on 1 September 1980. It was originally scheduled for a 1 August 1980 release date, but this was postponed due to the climbing chart action by another single on the Cheapskate label, Sue Wilkinson's "You Gotta Be a Hustler If You Wanna Get On". The label and its distributor decided to postpone the Dummies release in order to fully concentrate on promoting Wilkinson's single. The picture sleeve for "Didn't You Use to Use to Be You?" featured a photograph taken by Mickey Legg of Jim Lea's daughter Bonny wearing sunglasses and headphones. The B-side was a cover of the Slade song "Miles Out to Sea".

The song achieved A-list status on BBC Radio 1, thereby putting it in the station's 'featured 40', and was put on Radio Luxembourg's 'Bullets' list. It also achieved play on numerous Independent Local Radio stations, including Forth (hit pick), Beacon (C List), Swansea (A List), Mercia (B List), Pennine (B List), Thames Valley (B List), and Tees. Due to distribution issues, the single failed to make an appearance in the UK singles chart, but it did reach number 112 on Record Business magazine's Singles Chart in September 1980. Dave Robinson of Stiff Records subsequently offered to take the single on, but this did not come to fruition.

The song's success in achieving airplay restored faith in Lea and Holder's songwriting abilities. Holder told the Slade Fan Club in 1980, "The record got lots of radio play, so we knew that we could still write songs that would get played on the radio. We now knew that our songs were strong. Then it was a case of thinking, 'Where do Slade go from here?'"

In April 1982, Frank Lea reissued the single under his independent record label Speed Records. The song was renamed "One Hit Wonder" and the artist name was changed from the Dummies to the China Dolls.

== Promotion ==
Frank Lea was largely in charge of the single's publicity and radio promotion. Prior to its original intended release date of 1 August 1980, he began visiting local radio stations in the West Midlands in the last week of July 1980 with the single. In September 1980, the Dummies appeared on the BBC One children's TV show Multi-Coloured Swap Shop to perform both the song and its B-side.

== Critical reception ==
John Ogden of the Express & Star believed the "catchy and well-performed" single had "every chance of success". Melody Maker selected the single as one of their "pick[s] of the week". The reviewer praised it as "terrific" and noted the "shifting rhythms", "witty lyrics" and a "storming chorus".

== Track listing ==
7-inch single (UK)

1. "Didn't You Use to Use to Be You?" – 3:25
2. "Miles Out to Sea" – 3:17

7-inch single (The China Dolls 1982 UK reissue)

1. "One Hit Wonder" – 3:25
2. "Ain't Love Ain't Bad" – 2:56

== Personnel ==
The Dummies

- Jim Lea – vocals, all instruments
- Frank Lea – drums
- Louise Lea – vocals

Production

- Jim Lea – production
- Andy Miller – engineering
- Mark O'Donoughue – engineering
- Paul Hardiman – engineering

Other

- Mickey Legg – photography

== Charts ==
Chart (1980)	Peak position
UK Airplay Guide 100 (Record Business)	44
UK The Singles Chart (Record Business)	112
