= A Day in the Life of the Dummies =

Studio album by The Dummies
- Released: 10 March 1992
- Genre: Rock, pop
- Length: 39:40
- Label: Receiver Records Limited
- Producer: Jim Lea

A Day in the Life of the Dummies is a compilation album by The Dummies, which was a musical project of Jim Lea of Slade and his brother Frank. The album was released in March 1992 and gathers all of the 1979-80 recordings produced by the pair.

== Background ==
The Dummies was formed by the Jim and Frank Lea in 1979. With Slade suffering from a period of low popularity and resistance from radio, Jim wanted to find out whether it was his and lead vocalist Noddy Holder's songwriting or simply a reluctance from DJs to play new Slade material. The pair formed Cheapskate Records, which Frank wanted to use to prove that any independent label, with the right promotion and distribution, could release a hit single. The Dummies produced three singles between 1979 and 1981, and although they all failed to chart, they did gain radio play. While some tracks were recorded in 1979, much of the Dummies material was recorded in 1980.

"When the Lights Are Out", a cover of the 1974 Slade song, was released as the debut single in 1979. It gained extensive radio play, but suffered from distribution problems. By the time it was re-released on Pye Records at the beginning of 1980, the song was at the end of its airplay run and subsequently failed to chart. "Didn't You Use to Use to Be You?" followed in 1980, which was specifically written for the Dummies by Jim and Holder. The single generated much airplay and was expected to become a big hit, but suffered distribution issues. It was backed by a cover of Slade's "Miles Out to Sea" as the B-side. "Maybe Tonite" was released in 1981 as the final Dummies single. Another song purposely written for the project, it gained radio play but failed to chart. The B-side was a cover of Slade's "When I'm Dancin' I Ain't Fightin'".

During the late 1980s, Frank was surprised how much second-hand copies of the Dummies singles were selling for. He suggested releasing a compilation album to gather the Dummies recordings. In a 1988 fan club interview, Jim had commented: "We got into the studios and listened to it recently. Frank was keen to do it, but I'm not at the moment." Jim was reluctant to have such an album released as he felt that the production of the time did not do the songs justice. Despite this, it was announced in the Slade International Fan Club in early 1991 that such an album seemed likely to be released soon. A Day in the Life of the Dummies was released in 1992 by Receiver Records Limited.

The cover of Slade's "Nobody's Fool" was originally to be released as a single, but the idea was scrapped once more material had been recorded. As a result, the Dummies' version remained unreleased until it appeared on the album. Other Slade covers included "Jeanie Jeanie", "Burning in the Heat of Love" and "It Ain't Love It Ain't Bad". All were also previously unreleased, except "Burning in the Heat of Love", which surfaced in 1985 on the UK/German various artists compilation Metal Killers Kollection, where it was credited to Jim Lea rather than the Dummies. "Sheila" preceded Slade's recording of the song in 1984 for their twelfth studio album Rogues Gallery, though the Dummies' version was not released until its inclusion on this album. "Poland" is a reworking of Slade's "Lemme Love into Ya", and had first surfaced in 1982 as a Jim Lea single under the pseudonym Greenfields of Tong. "The Minute I Lost Control" was the third song to be specifically written by Holder and Lea for the Dummies, but not released at the time.

== Critical reception ==
Professional ratings
Review scores
Source	Rating
Trucking Magazine	favorable

In 2008, Trucking magazine reviewed the album alongside Jim Lea's 2007 solo album Therapy. The reviewer commented: "Most tracks are Slade covers and not a million miles from the originals, which in itself guarantees an album of great pop/rock songs that will have passed by all but the most ardent of Slade fans."

== Track listing ==
All tracks written and composed by Noddy Holder and Jim Lea

No.	Title	Length
1.	"Didn't You Use to Use to Be You?"	3:25
2.	"Maybe Tonight"	2:37
3.	"Nobody's Fool"	2:42
4.	"Jeanie Jeanie"	3:17
5.	"Burning in the Heat of Love"	3:01
6.	"Poland"	3:16
7.	"Sheila"	3:33
8.	"When I'm Dancin' I Ain't Fightin'"	3:08
9.	"The Minute I Lost Control"	2:05
10.	"When the Lights Are Out"	3:03
11.	"It Ain't Love It Ain't Bad"	2:56
12.	"Miles Out to Sea"	3:17
13.	"Poland (Instrumental)"	3:14

== Personnel ==
- Jim Lea - vocals, guitars, bass, keyboards
- Frank Lea - drums
- Louise Lea - chorus vocals (track 1)
- Dave Garland, Andy Miller, Mark O'Donoughue, Paul Hardiman - engineers
- D.C. Starr - illustration
