= Old New Borrowed and Blue =

Studio album by Slade
- Released: 15 February 1974
- Recorded: late 1973
- Genre: Glam rock
- Length: 37:32 (57:40 with bonus tracks)
- Label: Polydor (UK/Canada), Warner Bros. (US)
- Producer: Chas Chandler

Slade chronology
Sladest (1973)	Old New Borrowed and Blue (1974)	Slade in Flame (1974)

Singles from Old New Borrowed and Blue
- 1. "My Friend Stan" Released: 28 September 1973; 2. "Good Time Gals (America only)" Released: February 1974; 3. "Everyday" Released: 29 March 1974; 4. "When the Lights Are Out (America and Belgium only)" Released: May 1974

Old New Borrowed and Blue is the fourth studio album by the British rock group Slade. It was released on 15 February 1974 and reached No. 1 on the UK Albums Chart. It has been certified Gold by BPI. The album was produced by Chas Chandler. For the album, Slade attempted to begin breaking away from their usual rock formula. For example, the singles "My Friend Stan" and "Everyday" were piano-led and did not have the typical "Slade" sound.

In the US, the album was released by the Warner Bros. label under the title Stomp Your Hands, Clap Your Feet, minus the tracks "My Town" and "My Friend Stan" (as they had been previously released there on Sladest).

== Background ==
"Everyday"

"My Friend Stan"

"We've just finished recording our next album. It's got a lot of new things on it. Nothing very different or out of character, we've spent more time on arrangements and little ideas and effects."

— Don Powell discussing the album in 1974.

Old New Borrowed and Blue was recorded amid various touring and promotional activities in late 1973, and also during the headline-making recovery of drummer Don Powell, who was involved in a serious car crash in July, which killed his girlfriend and briefly threw the band's existence into doubt. Despite his critical condition, Powell was able to make a recovery and the band soon entered the studio to record material for their new album. During recording of "My Friend Stan", Powell was still walking with the aid of a stick and had to be lifted onto his drum stool. On the album, the band attempted to continue their usual formula on some tracks, while others took a change in musical direction. The album's title, as explained by Holder, came from the album's content, which the band felt had a mix of old, new, borrowed and blue songs.

"My Friend Stan" was released as the album's lead single in September 1973 and reached No. 2 in the UK. Over Christmas 1973, the band would also achieve success with their No. 1 single "Merry Xmas Everybody". Old New Borrowed and Blue was released in February 1974 and reached No. 1 in the UK. In the UK, Old New Borrowed and Blue was awarded Gold by BPI prior to its release, based purely on pre-order sales. At the time, a Slade spokesman had reported to the Record Mirror: "The album has sold twice as many cartridges and cassettes than their previous offerings." In March, the album's second single "Everyday" reached No. 3. In America, Stomp Your Hands, Clap Your Feet reached No. 168. "Good Time Gals" was issued there as a single in February 1974. Later in May, "When the Lights Are Out" was also issued in America and Belgium. Both singles failed to make any chart impact.

== Song information ==
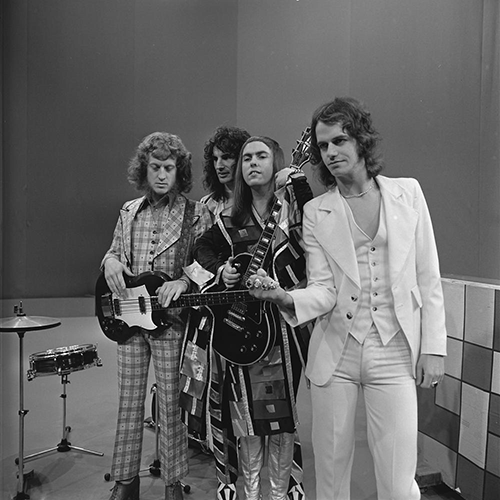
Slade appearing on the Dutch television show TopPop, a month after the album's release.

"Just a Little Bit" is a cover of the 1959 Rosco Gordon song, which was a minor hit in 1964 for Liverpool group The Undertakers. The song was later recorded in 1977 by The Animals too, of which Slade manager and producer Chas Chandler was bassist. At the time, the song was a regular inclusion in Slade's live set. "When the Lights Are Out" is the band's first track to feature Jim Lea on lead vocals. In a 1974 interview for the "19" readers, Holder jokingly commented: "There's nothing like a good singer and Jimmy's nothing like a good singer." The song was later covered by Bob Segarini in 1978 and American rock group Cheap Trick on their 2009 album The Latest. Lea would also record his own version with his brother Frank Lea under the name The Dummies in 1979. "My Town" originally appeared as the B-side to "My Friend Stan".

"Find Yourself a Rainbow" features honky-tonk piano as the main instrument, played by Tommy Burton. In a 1974 fab club interview, Powell stated: "Pub piano is played by a local landlord, Tommy Burton. He now owes us free booze for the rest of the year." On the album's inner gatefold sleeve, the lyrics of the song include an extra verse which was not on the song's recording. "Miles Out to Sea" was another song to later be recorded by The Dummies. Of the up-tempo tracks "We're Really Gonna Raise the Roof" and "Do We Still Do It", AllMusic stated: "Slade fans can be assured that these guys hadn't lost the will to rock out."

"How Can It Be" is a country-flavoured track with acoustic guitar. "Don't Blame Me" originally appeared as the B-Side to "Merry Xmas Everybody". In a 1979 fan club interview, Lea said of the song: ""Don't Blame Me" was a time-filler, I think that it was created as that. When it was used as a B-Side, we didn't even know it was being used, it was chosen by the offices."

Chandler had persuaded Lea to finish "My Friend Stan" after he heard Lea playing the melody at home on his piano. "Everyday" also features piano and was released as a single at Chandler's insistence. Jim Lea was totally opposed to it being an A-side and argued with Chandler for the duration of a flight from the UK to Australia. When it was released, the band knew they were taking a risk but "Everyday" would become a firm favourite on stage. The song featured Lea on guitar as guitarist Dave Hill was away on honeymoon at the time of the recording sessions. "Good Time Gals" also featured as the B-Side to "Everyday".

== Critical reception ==
Professional ratings
Review scores
Source	Rating
AllMusic	2.5/5 stars
AllMusic (US edition)	3/5 stars
BBC	4/5 stars
Christgau's Record Guide (US)	B
Record Collector	4/5 stars

Upon release, The Sun felt that the album marked the beginning of Slade becoming a "true album band". The reviewer commented that the songs were "toughening up" and the album was "expertly produced". American magazine Cash Box described the album as "another powerful collection of 'Toons'", with "raw power" being "the most immediate sensation you feel from the LP". At the Disc Music Awards 1974, the album was voted the tenth "best album of the year".

AllMusic retrospectively stated that the album saw Slade's "songwriting efforts" enter "more mellow pastures". In a review of Stomp Your Hands, Clap Your Feet, AllMusic said: "Full of trademark Slade rock & roll, Stomp Your Hands, Clap Your Feet continues the band's arena style stomp. Dated, a bit, but still rockin' hard." Bob Stanley of The Times retrospectively felt the album was the "pick of their early albums", stating: "This is joyous, unshackled and unpretentious stuff that reminds you how they rattled off six No. 1s." In 2010, Classic Rock considered the album "superior: reputation cementing" and noted the album's mix of "wistful ballads" and "mouth-watering commercial, hard rock nuggets".

== Track listing ==
All tracks are written by Noddy Holder and Jim Lea, except "Just Want a Little Bit" by John Thornton, Ralph Bass, Earl Washington, Piney Brown and Sylvester Thompson.

Side one
No.	Title	Length
1.	"Just a Little Bit"	4:00
2.	"When the Lights Are Out"	3:05
3.	"My Town"	3:06
4.	"Find Yourself a Rainbow"	2:11
5.	"Miles Out to Sea"	3:49
6.	"We're Really Gonna Raise the Roof"	3:09

Side two
No.	Title	Length
7.	"Do We Still Do It"	3:01
8.	"How Can It Be"	3:01
9.	"Don't Blame Me"	2:32
10.	"My Friend Stan"	2:41
11.	"Everyday"	3:10
12.	"Good Time Gals"	3:33

Japanese '24 Bit remaster 2006' bonus tracks
No.	Title	Writer(s)	Length
13.	"The Bangin' Man" (non-album single "The Bangin' Man")	Holder, Lea	4:14
14.	"She Did It To Me" (B-side of single "The Bangin' Man")	Holder, Lea	3:18

2006 Salvo remaster bonus tracks
No.	Title	Length
13.	"I'm Mee I'm Now and That's Orl" (B-side of "Cum on Feel the Noize")	3:40
14.	"Kill 'Em at the Hot Club Tonite" (B-side of "Skweeze Me, Pleeze Me")	3:20
15.	"The Bangin' Man" (1974 non-album single)	4:11
16.	"She Did It to Me" (B-side of "The Bangin' Man")	3:18
17.	"Slade Talk to "19" Readers" (Issued on a single-sided flexi-disc)	5:33

== Personnel ==
Slade

- Noddy Holder – lead vocals, rhythm guitar
- Dave Hill – lead guitar, backing vocals
- Jim Lea – bass, piano, guitar, backing vocals, lead vocals (track 2)
- Don Powell – drums, backing vocals

Additional personnel

- Chas Chandler – producer
- Tommy Burton – piano (track 4)
- Alan O'Duffy, George Chkiantz – engineer
- Dave Ferrante – mixing
- Wade Wood Associates – design
- Ian Murray – art direction
- Gered Mankowitz – photography

== Charts ==
=== Weekly charts ===
Weekly chart performance for Old New Borrowed and Blue
Chart (1974)	Peak position
Australian Albums (Kent Music Report)	6
Finnish Albums (Suomen virallinen lista)	2
German Albums (Offizielle Top 100)	20
Norwegian Albums (VG-lista)	3
UK Albums (OCC)	1
US Billboard 200	168
US Cash Box Top Albums (101 to 175)	140

Chart (2021)	Peak position
Scottish Albums (OCC)	50
UK Independent Albums (OCC)	21

=== Year-end charts ===
Year-end chart performance for Old New Borrowed and Blue
Chart (1974)	Position
German Albums (Offizielle Top 100)	48

== Certifications ==
Region	Certification	Certified units/sales
United Kingdom (BPI)	Gold	100,000^{^}
^{^} Shipments figures based on certification alone.
