= Radio Wall of Sound =

1991 single by Slade

Single by Slade

from the album Wall of Hits
- B-side: "Lay Your Love on the Line"
- Released: 7 October 1991
- Genre: Rock
- Length: 3:47
- Label: Polydor
- Songwriter: Jim Lea
- Producer: Jim Lea

Slade singles chronology
"Let's Dance '88" (1988)	"Radio Wall of Sound" (1991)	"Universe" (1991)

Audio sample
- file; help

"Radio Wall of Sound" is a song by English rock band Slade, released on 7 October 1991 as the first single from their compilation album Wall of Hits. Written and produced by bassist Jim Lea, the song reached number 21 in the UK Singles Chart and remained in the top 100 for five weeks. It was Slade's last hit single, discounting later chartings of "Merry Xmas Everybody".

== Background ==
After their contract with RCA expired in 1987, Slade decided to take an 18-month break. Although they announced their intentions to record a new album, these plans did not materialise. Later, in 1991, their former label Polydor approached them with the idea of recording two new singles to promote a compilation album Wall of Hits. The two singles, "Radio Wall of Sound" and "Universe", were soon completed, with the former being released in October 1991. It reached No. 21 in the UK, earning the band their twenty-fourth Top 40 single and their first Top 40 hit since 1984. It was even voted the 'Single of the Week' by listeners on Simon Mayo's BBC Radio 1 show. As part of the deal with Polydor, if both "Radio Wall of Sound" and the follow-up single "Universe" were successful, a new studio album would be recorded. However, "Universe" failed to chart over Christmas, and Slade disbanded in 1992.

"Radio Wall of Sound" was originally a solo song by Lea, who had completed much of the recording before it became a Slade tune. He had first mentioned it in a 1990 fan club interview: "It sounds just like Slade, even my brother Frank says it sounds like Slade." In 1991, when Holder attempted to record his vocals, the band realised that Lea's existing recording was not in his key. As a result, Lea performed the lead vocal, with Holder joining in during the chorus. To provide the DJ voice-over parts in the song, the band approached the broadcaster/presenter Mike Read. Recalling the song in his autobiography Seize the Day, Read said: "They felt that the song needed a punchy American-style DJ delivery to give it some pace, so they asked if I'd pop up to the studio in north London."

Describing the song as a "more commercial, good instant rock track", Holder said of the single's performance, in a 1992 fan club interview: "It wouldn't have needed that many sales to have reached that position, not a vast amount. The initial shipping out to the shops was around 30,000 copies, I think, which is a good pre-order figure, good enough to go Top 40 first week out. The problem was sustaining the momentum after using up all the available TV's there was nowhere else to go. We couldn't get on Wogan, which would have helped, so really that was all the TV possible." In a 2000 interview with Mojo, Lea recalled of the song: "Our last hit was "Radio Wall of Sound", which I wrote and sang. The others thought it was a load of shit. Towards the end the records were completely my songs. I'd taken control and it didn't feel like a band any more. All the fun had gone out of it, so I started getting into the property business, and took a psychology course at college."

== Release ==
"Radio Wall of Sound" was released by Polydor Records on 7" vinyl, CD and cassette in the UK and across Europe. In the UK, the single was also released on 12" vinyl. The B-side, "Lay Your Love on the Line", written by guitarist Dave Hill and ex-Wizzard keyboardist Bill Hunt, was exclusive to the single and would later appear on the band's 2007 compilation B-Sides. On the 12" and CD formats of the single, the band's 1973 hit "Cum On Feel the Noize" was also included as a second B-side.

== Promotion ==
A music video was filmed to promote "Radio Wall of Sound", which was directed by William Clark and filmed in September 1991. The video was set on the roof-top of a radio station and featured an appearance from disc jockey Mike Read. Towards the end of the video, the radio tower on the roof of the building explodes. In the UK, the band performed the song on Top of the Pops and Motormouth.

== Critical reception ==
Upon its release, Alan Jones of Music Week chose "Radio Wall of Sound" as the magazine's "pick of the week" and commented, "More than 20 years after Noddy and his pals first came to prominence their spelling has improved, and their ability to write rock anthems remains intact. Should be their first Top 40 hit since 1984." Mike Dillon of the Paisley Daily Express praised the song as "actually quite good" and added, "It blows anything Status Quo have done in the last 10 years away. Rock 'n' roll by geratrics, but good nevertheless." Tony Parsons of The Daily Telegraph wrote, "I just paid £4.29 for the CD maxi single of the week – Slade's 'Radio Wall of Sound', a riot of mindless hormones and wanton hedonism. I call that a bargain."

English heavy metal band Wolfsbane, as guest reviewers for Kerrang!, were positive towards the single. Vocalist Blaze Bayley said, "So long as there's sounds like this on the radio, it gives us all hope!" Guitarist Jase Edwards commented, "[This] record is everything Slade are about. What a great record. They show [Status] Quo up!" Bassist Jeff Hateley stated, "When Noddy's voice comes in, it's like putting on an old pair of docs. The familiarity's great. I can relate to Slade totally. And they never really went crap, did they? They just did less. I'd sooner have Slade knocking around than Quo."

In a 1991 feature on Slade, John Millard of News of the World commented, "Slade are still very, very noisy. October's hit 'Radio Wall of Sound' was a less-than-gentle reminder of Slade's raucous, stomping heyday in the seventies." In the 2013 book Yeah Yeah Yeah: The Story of Modern Pop, author Bob Stanley described the song as a "stellar moment" in the band's latter-day career.

== Track listings ==
7-inch and cassette single

1. "Radio Wall of Sound" – 3:47
2. "Lay Your Love on the Line" – 3:09

12-inch and CD single

1. "Radio Wall of Sound" – 3:47
2. "Lay Your Love on the Line" – 3:09
3. "Cum On Feel the Noize" – 4:31

== Personnel ==
Slade

- Noddy Holder – vocals
- Jim Lea – lead vocals, bass, producer
- Dave Hill – lead guitar
- Don Powell – drums

Additional personnel

- Mike Read – DJ voice ("Radio Wall of Sound")
- Bill Hunt – keyboards ("Lay Your Love on the Line")
- Craig Fenney – bass ("Lay Your Love on the Line")
- Bob Lamb – drums ("Lay Your Love on the Line")
- The Leisure Process – design

== Charts ==
Chart (1991)	Peak position
Belgium (Ultratop 50 Flanders)	21
Europe (Eurochart Hot 100)	46
Europe (European Hit Radio)	36
Ireland (IRMA)	30
Netherlands (Dutch Top 40)	14
Netherlands (Single Top 100)	22
UK Singles (OCC)	21
UK Top 50 Airplay Chart (Music Week)	12

== Cover versions ==
- In 2001, English vocalist/musician Mick White recorded a version of the track for the tribute album Slade Remade.
