= Sue Wilkinson =

Sue Wilkinson may refer to:

- Sue Wilkinson (professor), feminist academic and advocate for same-sex marriage
- Sue Wilkinson (singer), British singer
