= Chrome Molly =

English hard rock band

- Origin: Leicester, England
- Genres: Hard rock, heavy metal
- Years active: 1984–1991, 2009–present
- Labels: Powerstation, I.R.S., Music for Nations, Edel
- Members: Steve Hawkins; Nic Wastell; John Foottit; Andy Barrott; Greg Ellis
- Past members: Chris Green; Mark Godfrey; Tim Read; Ian Jones; John Boyer; John Antcliffe; Sam Flint; Banksy
- Website: www.chromemolly.com

Chrome Molly are an English hard rock band from Leicester. They formed in 1982, releasing four albums before splitting up in 1991. They re-formed in 2009.

== History ==
The band formed in 1982, and after an early demo settled on a line-up of singer Steve Hawkins, guitarist John Antcliffe, bass guitarist Nic Wastell and drummer Chris Green. Mark Godfrey (Drums) replaced Chris Green after the release of the "You Said" EP (Bullet Records, BOLT 10) in 1984 and prior to the recording of the band's debut album, You Can't Have It All...or Can You?, which was released in 1985. The album was received enthusiastically by the music press. For instance reviewers of British newspaper Music Week gave it the highest rating and expressed a wish that the band have to progress into something bigger.

After the second album Stick It Out (1987), Antcliffe was replaced by Tim Read, and the band signed to I.R.S. Records. IRS released the third album Angst in April 1988, which included a cover version of Squeeze's "Take Me I'm Yours". They toured as support act with Alice Cooper on his Raise Your Fist And Yell tour in 1988, with guitarist Andrew Barrott added to the line-up. The band's third and final single release for the label was "Shooting Me Down", which was written by Jim Lea and Noddy Holder of Slade and produced by Lea. The single received airplay on BBC Radio 1 but suffered from a dispute between I.R.S. and distributors MCA Records. They moved on to the Music for Nations label for fourth album Slaphead (1990). The band split up in 1991, although they played together as Van Halen tribute band Von Halen a few times.

The band reformed in 2009 with members of the early line-up Hawkins, Antcliffe and Wastell joined by Greg Ellis, and announced a new album, Gunpowder Diplomacy.

The band's first two albums were reissued by Cherry Red sublabel, Lemon Recordings, in 2010.

The band returned to the studio with Toby Jepson from Little Angels in the producers chair; the album Gunpowder Diplomacy was released in 2013 by earMUSIC.

Johnny Antcliffe left the band in December 2014 to be replaced in 2015 by John Foottit, the band returned to the studio in August 2015 to record their sixth studio album with Jepson again in the production role. The band's sixth studio album Hoodoo Voodoo was released in January 2017 on Edel Records.

In September former member Andy Barrott returned to the line up replacing Sam Flint. Barrott was a member in the 1980s, and was formerly a member of Geddes Axe, Baby Tuckoo and the Dukes of Bordello.

== Discography ==
=== Albums ===
- You Can't Have It All...or Can You? (1985), Powerstation
- Stick It Out (1987), Powerstation
- Angst (1988), IRS
- Slaphead (1990), Music for Nations
- Gunpowder Diplomacy (2013), Edel
- Hoodoo Voodoo (2017), Edel

=== Compilation albums ===
- You Can't Have It All...or Can You?/Stick It Out (2010), Lemon

=== Singles ===
- "You Said" (1984), Bullet
- "Take It or Leave It" (1985), Powerstation
- "I Want to Find Out" (1986), Powerstation
- "Take Me I'm Yours" (1988), IRS UK Chart: no. 115
- "Thanx for the Angst" (1988), IRS UK Chart: no. 137
- "Shooting Me Down" (1988), IRS

== See also ==
- List of new wave of British heavy metal bands
