= When the Lights Are Out =

Single by Slade

from the album Old New Borrowed and Blue
- B-side: "How Can It Be"
- Released: May 1974
- Genre: Rock
- Length: 3:05
- Label: Warner Bros.
- Songwriters: Noddy Holder, Jim Lea
- Producer: Chas Chandler

Slade singles chronology
"Everyday" (1974)	"When the Lights Are Out" (1974)	"The Bangin' Man" (1974)

"When the Lights Are Out" is a song by the British rock band Slade, released in 1974 as the fourth and final single from their fourth studio album Old New Borrowed and Blue (known as Stomp Your Hands, Clap Your Feet in America). The single was released in America and Belgium only. The song was written by lead vocalist Noddy Holder and bassist Jim Lea, and produced by Chas Chandler.

== Background ==
The material on Old New Borrowed and Blue was recorded amid the band's touring and promotional activities in late 1973. It also marked the return of drummer Don Powell to the studio after suffering a near-fatal car crash in July, which briefly threw the band's existence into doubt. In America, the album was titled Stomp Your Hands, Clap Your Feet and released in February 1974. That same month, the lead single in America, "Good Time Gals", was released but failed to chart. "When the Lights Are Out" followed as the second single in May and was released to coincide with the band's American tour of May–June. However, it also failed to gain any commercial success. In a fan question and answer session with Lea in 2017, he revealed his wish that the song had been given a full single release in the UK and elsewhere: "After "Merry Christmas Everybody" and the massive success of 1973 it was hard to find a follow-up quickly. I wanted "When the Lights Are Out" (not because I sang it), but I recorded it as The Dummies and it was play-listed at Radio 1 and record of the week on Radio Luxembourg too."

"When the Lights Are Out" was the first Slade song to feature Jim Lea on lead vocals, with Noddy Holder joining in on the chorus. In a 1974 interview for readers of 19 magazine, Holder jokingly commented of the track: "There's nothing like a good singer and Jimmy's nothing like a good singer." Speaking to Ken Sharp in 1999, Lea recalled: "I've never considered myself to be a singer and was never considered by anyone in the band to be a singer. But it was Nod's idea that I should sing that, 'cause he said "Look, why don't you sing it?" and some people said I sounded a little bit like John Lennon, you know, my hero. It's triple tracked because my singing's so bad! I triple tracked it to try and even the tuning out a little bit."

== Release ==
"When the Lights Are Out" was released on 7" vinyl by Warner Bros. Records in America only, but also in Belgium as an import. The B-side, "How Can It Be", was written by Holder and Lea, and also included on Old New Borrowed and Blue. In addition to the main US release, a promotional version was also issued, containing "When the Lights Are Out" on both sides of the vinyl, one in mono and the other in stereo. The Belgian release was merely the imported US release, but housed in a Belgian-printed picture sleeve.

== Track listing ==
7" Single

1. "When the Lights Are Out" - 3:05
2. "How Can It Be" - 3:01

7" Single (US promo)

1. "When the Lights Are Out" - 3:05
2. "When the Lights Are Out" - 3:05

== Critical reception ==
Upon release, Cash Box selected the song as one of their "picks of the week" and said: "Slade has built their reputation on their brash, loud, hard rocking quality that made them England's #1 rockers. This disk, however, is a bit of a departure. Not as hard, yet still rocking, this is a perfect Top 40 outing that many stations will find more desirable than any of their previous efforts. Good hook and even more attention to the music, Slade looks finally to have matured and seems ready to break out big in America." In a review of Old New Borrowed and Blue, New Musical Express considered the song as "one of the LP's prime contenders for single status". They said of the song: "Jimmy Lea sings "When the Lights Are Out" in a softer version of the Holder roar, and makes a nice job of it. The band should use him more, if only for contrast." Billboard said: "Bassist Jimmy Lea also gets a chance to sing on the pretty "When the Lights Are Out".

In a retrospective review, Dave Thompson of AllMusic commented: ""We're Gonna Raise the Roof," "When the Lights Are Out," and "My Town," too, offer little that Slade wasn't already well renowned for and that, perhaps, was what the band members were thinking as well. The glitter-soaked thunderclap was old news now; they could write those rockers in their sleep." He also highlighted the song as an AMG Pick Track. Classic Rock described the song as a "mouth-watering commercial, hard rock nugget". Stephen Thomas Erlewine, in an AllMusic review of Cheap Trick's The Latest, described the song as an "overlooked Slade gem". Ian Fortnam of Teamrock selected the song as one in his article "10 Slade songs that prove they're bigger than just Xmas". He said: "A certain congruence of style between Holder/Lea and Lennon/McCartney has been remarked upon before, but nowhere is it more clearly demonstrated than when Jimmy Lea steps forward to take a lead vocal on this easily overlooked album track from spring '74's Old New Borrowed and Blue. Cheap Trick covered it on 2009's The Latest where it fitted perfectly as one of the best Cheap Trick songs Cheap Trick never wrote."

== Cover versions ==
- In 1978, American singer Bob Segarini recorded a version of the song for his album Gotta Have Pop. It was also released as a single in Canada in November that year.
- In 1979, Jim Lea would record his own version of the song with his brother Frank as part of his side-project The Dummies. It was released as a single by Cheapskate Records in December 1979, added to Radio One's playlist and became Paul Burnett's "Record of the Week". However, the single suffered from distribution problems, and by the time it had been given a re-release on Pye Records in January 1980, the airplay had dropped and the song failed to chart. The single spent one week as a "breaker" on the Record Business Airplay Guide chart in January 1980. Pye also released the single in Germany in April 1980. The version would be included on the 1992 album A Day in the Life of the Dummies, which gathered The Dummies' recordings.
- In 2009, American rock band Cheap Trick included a version on their sixteenth studio album The Latest, from which it was the lead single. It had been recorded in 1976, but was not released as that time. While recording new material, producer Julian Raymond insisted the song be included on the album. In an interview of the time he said: "I couldn't believe it wasn't released in '76 when the band did it. I insisted they put it on the record just as it was."

== Personnel ==
Slade

- Noddy Holder - backing vocals, guitar
- Dave Hill - lead guitar, backing vocals
- Jim Lea - lead vocals, bass
- Don Powell - drums

Additional personnel

- Chas Chandler - producer
