= Everyday (Slade song) =

- German/Yugoslavian cover of "Everyday".

Single by Slade

from the album Old New Borrowed and Blue
- B-side: "Good Time Gals"
- Released: 29 March 1974
- Length: 3:05
- Label: Polydor
- Songwriters: Noddy Holder; Jim Lea; Louise Lea (uncredited)
- Producer: Chas Chandler

Slade singles chronology
"Merry Xmas Everybody" (1973)	"Everyday" (1974)	"When the Lights Are Out" (1974)

Audio sample
- file; help

"Everyday" is a song by the British rock band Slade, released in 1974 as the second single from their fourth studio album, Old New Borrowed and Blue. It was written by lead vocalist Noddy Holder, bassist Jim Lea and his wife Louise Lea (uncredited), and was produced by Chas Chandler. It reached number 3 in the UK Singles Chart and spent seven weeks in the top 50. The single was certified UK Silver by BPI in April 1974, only three days after its release.

In 2013, the song was used in a UK advert for the Nexus 7 tablet. As a result, it re-entered the UK chart in late November and peaked at number 69 the following month.

== Background ==
With the release of Old New Borrowed and Blue in February 1974, the band's manager Chas Chandler suggested "Everyday" be released as the second single from the album. The band's popularity in the UK meant that there was a big demand for a new release. However, the band, particularly Lea, did not feel the song was single material. On a flight to Australia for a short tour there, Chandler and Lea argued about the idea; however, Chandler ultimately won, and "Everyday" was released as a single in March. Being a piano-led ballad, which was an unusual style for Slade, the band knew they were taking a risk. "Everyday" reached No. 3 in the UK and would go on to become a regular sing-a-long inclusion at the band's concerts.

The idea for "Everyday" came out of an evening at Lea's house where he was entertaining friends. Responding to the question of how he wrote songs, Lea said "easy, anyone can do it" and each person then attempted to come up with their idea for a song on the spot. Lea's wife Louise had come up with an idea, which formed the basis of "Everyday"'s verse. Lea later developed her idea further to become a Slade song. Once he had finished the music and some more of the lyrics, Holder finished the final lyrics off. During the recording of the song, guitarist Dave Hill was abroad on his honeymoon so Lea played the guitar solo.

During a 2017 live question and answer event with Lea at the Robin 2 club, Lea was asked whether his wife received a writing credit for the song. He replied: "No, she didn't. I feel really bad about that and I have spoken to Nod about it. She should have a credit, it should be Lea, Lea, Holder. Why I didn't credit Lou on it was because it wasn't that long before with the John and Yoko thing going on, where Yoko was in the studio all the time and it was messing about with the Beatles. And I didn't want to have that sort of pressure. I mean, Lou wouldn't have done it anyway, she would never have pressured me. She should have a credit now I think, I should put it to the publishers that that's what we should do."

== Release ==
"Everyday" was released on 7" vinyl by Polydor Records in the UK, Ireland, across Europe, Australia, New Zealand, South Africa and Japan. The B-side, "Good Time Gals", had also previously appeared as an album track on Old New Borrowed and Blue.

== Promotion ==
In the UK, the band performed the song twice on the music show Top of The Pops (28 March and 11 April), and on Clunk Click. The band also performed the song on the Dutch AVRO TV show TopPop.

== Critical reception ==
Upon its release as a single, Peter Jones of Record Mirror noted the "quite remarkable change of style" for Slade, trading in their "stomping, barnstorming, rabble-rousing" sound for a "gentle ballad". He felt the song showed the "plaintive side" of Holder, though "the rasp has not vanished from [his] voice", and concluded, "This lull, this leaning on lilting rather than lambasting, is not only welcome – it's great stuff. Lovely little melody; nice performance. Smash hit. And already one of my favourite Slade efforts." Michael Hewins of the Coventry Evening Telegraph awarded four stars and wrote, "As much as it's undeniably Slade – no one sounds like Noddy – it's undeniably totally different from anything they've come up with before. A ballad with a catchy melody line that hooks you and won't let go. It can't fail."

In a retrospective review of Old New Borrowed and Blue, Dave Thompson of AllMusic wrote, "'Everyday' held the secret of the band's future, a crowd-swaying singalong of such scarf-waving majesty that it might well be single-handedly responsible for every great record U2 has ever made". In 2005, BBC Radio 2 ranked the song at number 9 out of 100 in their "Sold on Song" library and commented on Holder's "decidedly affectionate and most un-Slade-like lyric". They added, "It was a rare sentimental concession from the band who built their reputation on some of the best-loved rock 'n' roll of the 1970s."

== Track listing ==
7-inch single

1. "Everyday" – 3:05
2. "Good Time Gals" – 3:28

== Personnel ==
Slade

- Noddy Holder – lead vocals
- Jim Lea – piano, lead guitar, bass, backing vocals
- Don Powell – drums

Production

- Chas Chandler – production

== Charts ==
=== Weekly charts ===
Chart (1974)	Peak position
Australia (Kent Music Report)	13
Austria (Ö3 Austria Top 40)	13
Belgium (Ultratop 50 Flanders)	22
Belgium (Ultratop 50 Wallonia)	9
Finland (Suomen virallinen lista)	7
Ireland (IRMA)	4
Netherlands (Dutch Top 40)	4
Netherlands (Single Top 100)	4
New Zealand (Listener)	4
Norway (VG-lista)	3
Switzerland (Schweizer Hitparade)	7
UK Singles (OCC)	3
West Germany (GfK)	17

Chart (2013)	Peak position
UK Singles (OCC)	69

=== Year-end charts ===
Chart (1974)	Rank
Australia (Kent Music Report)	93
