= Universe (Slade song) =

1991 single by Slade

Single by Slade

from the album Wall of Hits
- B-side: "Red Hot"; "Merry Xmas Everybody"
- Released: 2 December 1991
- Studio: Rich Bitch Studios
- Genre: Rock
- Length: 4:15
- Label: Polydor
- Songwriter(s): Jim Lea
- Producer(s): Jim Lea

Slade singles chronology
"Radio Wall of Sound" (1991)	"Universe" (1991)	"Merry Xmas Everybody '98 Remix" (1998)

Audio sample
- file; help

"Universe" is a song by English rock band Slade, released on 2 December 1991 as the second single from their compilation album Wall of Hits (1991). It was written and produced by bassist Jim Lea. "Universe" reached number 76 in the UK Singles Chart and was the band's last single before disbanding in 1992.

== Background ==
"Universe" was the second of two new singles to be released from the band's 1991 compilation album Wall of Hits. Earlier that year, Polydor approached the band with their plans to release a new compilation album and offered them the opportunity to record two new singles to promote it. The contract signed by the band was for two new singles, with the option for a new studio album if both performed well commercially. The band subsequently used Birmingham's Rich Bitch Studios in mid-1991 to record some new songs. The first new single, "Radio Wall of Sound", was released in October 1991 and reached number 21 in the UK Singles Chart, giving the band their first UK top 40 hit since 1984. Wall of Hits followed in November and would peak at number 34 in the UK Albums Chart.

"Universe" was released at the beginning of December and was intended to continue promoting and boosting sales of Wall of Hits. The single was originally scheduled for a mid-November release but Polydor pushed the date back to 2 December. "Universe" failed to replicate the success of "Radio Wall of Sound" and stalled at number 76 in the UK Singles Chart. The disappointing performance of the single resulted in Polydor declining the option for a new studio album and the band split up in March 1992.

In a 1992 fan club interview, lead vocalist Noddy Holder spoke of the song in relation to "Radio Wall of Sound" and its commercial failure, "I liked 'Universe' even though I knew it was not such an instant song and it would take people time to latch on to it. I saw [it] as the stronger song and maybe if we had held it back for a while it may have been more successful but unfortunately it got lost in the Christmas market. We didn't realise how late 'Universe' was coming out; it was actually two weeks later than planned. I don't know why, but by then we were into the Christmas mania season and, not being such an instant track, it lost out to the more popular records." In his 1999 biography Who's Crazee Now?, Holder recalled, "'Universe' was very orchestral, backed by strings and totally unlike anything we had ever done before as Slade. I liked it, just because it was so different. It bombed [and] was too far from what people expected of us."

Lea originally intended for both "Universe" and "Radio Wall of Sound" to be used for a solo project until they became Slade tracks for the deal with Polydor. The B-side "Red Hot" was a recording made by Dave Hill with other musicians to which Noddy Holder added vocals. In 2007, Lea released his own version of "Universe" on his debut solo album Therapy. In 2023, Lea released a new recording of the song, which reached number 1 on The Heritage Chart.

== Music video ==
The song's music video, directed by William Clark, was filmed at a studio in Shepherd's Bush on 21 November 1991. Drummer Don Powell noted in his diary at the time that "we go Amadeus [in] the video", in reference to the 1984 American period drama film of the same name.

== Promotion ==
With the release of "Universe" in Europe on 6 January 1992, Slade made what would be their final public appearance together as a band on the German TV show Gottschalk on 26 February to perform the song.

== Critical reception ==
Upon its release, Rozalla, as guest reviewer for Smash Hits, stated, "I'm not sure about this record. It's not very special, is it? I like the Christmas record they made years ago [and] they should have just released that one again." A reviewer for the Kentish Gazette noted the "crafty piece of packaging" by including "Merry Xmas Everybody" as a B-side. They wrote, "Just when it looked as if (shock) the classic was not going to be released this year, it is slipped in [as a] B-side on a new single."

== Formats ==
7-inch (UK and Europe) and cassette single (UK)

1. "Universe" – 4:18
2. "Red Hot" – 3:35
3. "Merry Xmas Everybody" – 3:43

12-inch and CD single (UK and Europe)

1. "Universe" – 4:18
2. "Red Hot" – 3:35
3. "Gypsy Roadhog" – 3:27
4. "Merry Xmas Everybody" – 3:43

== Personnel ==
Slade

- Noddy Holder – lead vocals
- Jim Lea – bass, synthesiser, producer of "Universe" and "Red Hot", arranger and mixer on "Universe"
- Dave Hill – lead guitar
- Don Powell – drums

Additional musicians

- Edward Shermaur – orchestral arrangement ("Universe")
- Bill Hunt – keyboards ("Red Hot")
- Craig Fenney – bass ("Red Hot")
- Bob Lamb – drums ("Red Hot")
- Norma Lewis – backing vocals ("Red Hot")

Production

- Jim Lea – production ("Universe" and "Red Hot"), arrangement and mixing ("Universe")
- Trevor Hallesy – engineering and mixing ("Universe")
- Paul Talbot – engineering ("Red Hot")
- Chas Chandler – production ("Merry Xmas Everybody" and "Gypsy Roadhog")

Other

- Ray Palmer – sleeve photography
- Allan D. Martin – sleeve design

== Charts ==
Chart (1991)	Peak position
UK Singles Chart	76
