= Shooting Me Down =

1988 song by Chrome Molly

Single by Chrome Molly
- B-side: "Led Heavy"
- Released: 14 November 1988
- Length: 3:06
- Label: I.R.S.
- Songwriters: Jim Lea; Noddy Holder
- Producer: Jim Lea

Chrome Molly singles chronology
"Thanx for the Angst" (1988)	"Shooting Me Down" (1988)

"Shooting Me Down" is a song by English rock band Chrome Molly, released by I.R.S. as a non-album single on 14 November 1988. The song was written by Slade members Jim Lea and Noddy Holder, and was produced by Lea.

== Background ==
"Shooting Me Down" was originally written for Samantha Fox, whose label, Jive Records, approached Jim Lea and Noddy Holder (of the English rock band Slade) in 1987, asking them to provide a song for her upcoming second studio album, with Lea also to produce the track. The song was written, demoed and sent to Jive within a couple of weeks during April 1987 but, when Fox's latest single "Nothing's Gonna Stop Me Now" began generating chart action in the UK in May, Jive quickly had her new album hastily packaged and ready for a July 1987 release. As a result, there was not enough time for Fox to record "Shooting Me Down" and, although Jive liked the track and wished to keep hold of it for the future, the singer never recorded it.

"Shooting Me Down" was then put aside and, according to the Birmingham Evening Mail, was intended to be recorded by Slade at a future date as their "comeback" single. However, with the band on hiatus at the time, the song ended up being given to Chrome Molly to record. In 1987, Chrome Molly expressed an interest in working with Lea and sent him some of their demo tapes, although no collaboration materialised as the band did not have a record deal. After signing to I.R.S. Records in 1988, they released their album Angst and two singles from it, "Take Me I'm Yours" and "Thanx for the Angst", but both failed to reach the top 100 of the UK Singles Chart. Wishing to make their commercial breakthrough, the band approached Lea in the summer of 1988 with a song which they intended to record as their next single. The band originally hoped that Lea and John Punter would produce the single, but an agreement was subsequently made for Lea to produce it on his own.

At the same time, Lea forwarded his and Holder's demo of "Shooting Me Down" to Chrome Molly "in case they might like it". The band loved the track and immediately began performing it live. I.R.S. also approved of the track and it was agreed that the song would be recorded as the band's next single with Lea as the producer. The song was recorded in three days. Lea revealed in a 1988 interview for the Slade fan club magazine Perseverance, "I saw Chrome Molly play [live] on a Saturday and we were in the studio on the [following] Monday. I didn't know the guys at all and we didn't even rehearse it, but everything went great." Bassist Nic Wastell told the Leicester Mercury in 2010, "I'd say it was the nearest we got to capturing the true sound of the band on tape."

Speaking of the song, Lea told Perseverance magazine in 1988,

"It [is] a bit Bon Jovi-esque, but then again, Bon Jovi are like Slade anyway. They're sort of us now if you like. Funnily enough, I've just done an interview with Kerrang! about it and they suggested that it was very much like what Bon Jovi might have done. I replied yes it probably is, but was it really like that or what Slade might have done? I told him that Bruno Brookes played 'Mama Weer All Crazee Now' straight after Bon Jovi's 'Bad Medicine' the other night and he had commented that a lot of the sounds in today's rock bands were done by Slade years ago. The reporter thought about it again and agreed that a lot of American bands do sound like an updated version of Slade, which was quite a compliment!"

== Release ==
"Shooting Me Down" was released by I.R.S. on 14 November 1988, with distribution and marketing by MCA. Initial response to the single was positive and it picked up airplay on BBC Radio 1. Shortly after its release, a dispute between I.R.S. and MCA resulted in thousands of copies of the single remaining in storage rather than being distributed to retailers. Bassist Nic Wastell told the Leicester Mercury in 2010, "The plan was to push it and push it, sell enough to get into the top 40 – and then get on Top of the Pops. I.R.S. had a big fallout with MCA. I remember playing a gig in Bristol just after the single was out [and] we met some of the fans afterwards [who] said: 'We can't buy your single. We can't find it anywhere.' And that was the first we knew of it." Vocalist Steve Hawkins recalled to Louder in 2017, "That single was fantastic. It was just a shame that there were political issues with the label and distribution that meant it didn't get the push it needed. It was getting radio airplay, but the records were sitting in a warehouse." As a result, the band failed to achieve a commercial breakthrough and, after releasing the album Slaphead through the Music for Nations label in 1990, split up in 1991.

== Critical reception ==
Upon its release, Phil Wilding of Kerrang! wrote, "A massive step in the right direction from Bonk's boys, who've been knocking on the door of success for aeons. This will hit it off its hinges. Groovy." The same issue of the magazine featured Darren Wharton of Dare as a guest reviewer. He drew comparisons to Bon Jovi, but added that "it sounds as good as Bon Jovi, it's not a poor copy". He concluded, "They should make a video with them all flying around and they'd have a hit. It's good." Solo artist Lisa Dominique and her guitarist brother Marino were also guest reviewers and both were favourable of the single, calling it "really good/great". Marino noted that Chrome Molly have "actually made a record that capture[s] their live sound". In a 2010 feature on Chrome Molly, the Leicester Mercury called "Shooting Me Down" a "catchy, terrace anthem" which was "a clear cut above what the band had done before".

== Track listing ==
7-inch single (UK)

1. "Shooting Me Down" – 3:06
2. "Led Heavy" – 4:27

12-inch single (UK)

1. "Shooting Me Down" – 3:06
2. "Led Heavy" – 4:27
3. "Shooting Me Down" (In Flames Remix) – 3:11
4. "Thanx for the Angst" (Remix) – 3:36

== Personnel ==
Chrome Molly

- Steve Hawkins – vocals
- Tim Read – guitar
- Nic Wastell – bass
- Mark Godfrey – drums

Production

- Jim Lea – production ("Shooting Me Down")
- Trevor Hallesy – engineering ("Shooting Me Down")
- Chrome Molly – production ("Led Heavy")
- Roy Neave – production ("Thanx for the Angst")
- Kevin Nixon – production ("Thanx for the Angst")
- Don Dokken – remixing ("Thanx for the Angst")

Other

- The Leisure Process – design
- Charles Best – photography

== Charts ==
Chart (1988)	Peak position
UK Heavy Metal Singles (Spotlight Research)	14
