= John Birch (luthier) =

- Born: 1922; West Bridgford, Nottinghamshire, England
- Died: 6 November 2000
- Occupation: Luthier
- Instrument: Electric guitar

John Birch (1922 – 6 November 2000) was an English luthier mainly known for his electric guitars. His customers included Tony Iommi and Geezer Butler of Black Sabbath, Brian May of Queen, Manny Charlton of Nazareth, Dave Hill and Jim Lea of Slade, Gerry Shephard of The Glitter Band, Roy Orbison and Nicky Panicci.
