= Therapy (James Whild Lea album) =

Studio album by James Whild Lea
- Released: 2007 (original release); November 2009 (double CD release); 23 September 2016 (re-issue)
- Genre: Rock, Pop
- Length: 55:57
- Label: Jim Jam Records
- Producer: James Whild Lea

Therapy is the debut studio album by English musician Jim Lea, best known as the former bassist and songwriter of the British rock band Slade. Although Therapy is Lea's first solo album, he had previously released material as singles under various pseudonyms since the early 1980s.

== Background ==
After the disbanding of Slade in 1992, Lea entered the property business in 1993 and went on to study psychotherapy in 1997, although he did not take it up as a career. In 1998, he began writing and recording material again. However, beyond the release of the "I'll Be John, You Be Yoko" single in 2000, the material would remain unreleased as Lea was unsure of how to get the material released to the public. In 2000, Lea put his music plans on hold to care for his father, who died in 2002. That year, Lea performed a charity show "Jim Jam" at the Robin 2 club in Bilston and afterwards, in 2003, he decided to record a solo album. The first demos for the album had been made around the time of his father's death.

Titled Therapy, Lea arranged a meeting with Slade's former record label Polydor, however he decided to cancel after he felt that the label would not understand the project. Wishing to avoid conventional marketing strategies and the pressure to tour to promote the album, Lea decided to release Therapy independently in 2007. On his official website, Lea stated:

"I was never a naturally public figure, but now I am re-emerging as an artist in my own right, mostly free from the restrictions of the industry. There will be more to come soon, but for now make the journey, step on the train, and get some Therapy. The reason I have adopted this website approach, for now at least, is that every time I have spoken to a record company about putting my music out there, it always seems to be inexorably linked with touring, which is a great consumer of time, energy and of course money, in other words, a great obstacle."

== Song information ==
In 2007, "Heaven Can Wait" was rated eight out of ten by the magazine The Last Word. The song "Big Family" was originally recorded in 2000 by Belgian boy-band Mama's Jasje under the title "Samen Door Het Vuur". "Dead Rock U.K." references numerous musicians, mainly from the 1970s, including Marc Bolan, Freddie Mercury, Phil Lynott, John Lennon and John Bonham. During Lea's 2002 live performance at the Robin, he revealed that "Go Out in Style" was written about Keith Moon, the drummer of the English rock group The Who. The album contains a version of "Universe", a song that was written by Lea for Slade and released as a single in 1991. The song was Slade's last single, failing to chart after it was lost in the Christmas rush that year.

== Robin 2 Live ==
In 2002, Lea performed live for charity at the Robin 2 venue in Bilston. While most of the set-list contained covers, Lea performed two original songs that would appear on Therapy; "Great Big Family" and "Over the Moon", with the latter being re-titled "Go Out in Style". The entire Robin 2 gig was originally released in 2007 as a download on Lea's official site. Later in 2009, the gig was added as a bonus disc on a double CD edition of "Therapy". Although it contained the entire set-list of his main performance, it did not feature the encore tracks: "Get Down and Get with It", "Teddy Bears Picnic", "Johnny B. Goode", "Gudbuy T'Jane", "Twist and Shout", and "Purple Haze". During the concert, Lea performed covers of Slade hits "Cum On Feel the Noize", "Mama Weer All Crazee Now", "Far Far Away", "Gudbuy T'Jane" and "Get Down and Get with It".

== Release ==
Therapy was originally released in 2007 as a 13-track CD and digital release on Jim Jam Records. Although no singles were released from the album, the opening track "Heaven Can Wait" appeared on the promotional CD Now Hear This! 54, distributed free with Word magazine. In 2009, the album was released as a double CD to include the Robin 2 gig on the second disc.

In 2016, the album was re-issued as a double CD by Wienerworld. In addition to the altered colour of the sleeve, the re-issue featured three previously unreleased bonus tracks: "21st Century Thing?", "Thank God It's Friday Right Now" and "Am I the Greatest Now?" The 16-page booklet contained new liner notes from Lea, as well as memories of the Robin 2 gig by owner Mike Hamblett. A vinyl edition of Therapy was also released by Wienerworld in November 2016. It featured an additional three bonus tracks, two of which were previously unreleased: "Misty Morning Light" and "Dare to Be Great". The other bonus track, "I'll Be John, You Be Yoko" was released in 2000 as a single under the name "Whild".

== Track listing ==
All tracks are written by Jim Lea

No.	Title	Length
1.	"Heaven Can Wait (For Those Who Pray)"	4:12
2.	"Big Family"	3:55
3.	"The Smile of Elvis"	3:27
4.	"Dead Rock U.K."	5:26
5.	"Could God Be a Woman"	4:39
6.	"Go Out in Style"	4:11
7.	"Universe"	4:26
8.	"Time and Emotion"	3:29
9.	"Your Cine World"	4:18
10.	"The Valley of the Kings"	3:47
11.	"Why is Youth Always Wasted on the Young"	4:31
12.	"Notice"	3:59
13.	"Let Me Be Your Therapy"	5:37

Disc Two - Live at the Robin 2 Club - 2002
No.	Title	Writer(s)	Length
1.	"Intro"	Lea	1:34
2.	"Shakin' All Over"	Frederick Heath	3:37
3.	"I Saw Her Standing There"	John Lennon, Paul McCartney	3:43
4.	"Hey Joe"	Billy Roberts	5:58
5.	"I Am the Walrus"	John Lennon, Paul McCartney	3:21
6.	"Cum On Feel the Noize"	Noddy Holder, Lea	5:10
7.	"Great Big Family"	Lea	4:41
8.	"I Got You"	James Brown	3:42
9.	"You Really Got Me"	Ray Davies	2:48
10.	"Far Far Away"	Holder, Lea	5:34
11.	"Pretty Vacant"	Paul Cook, Stephen Jones, Glen Matlock, Johnny Rotten	3:54
12.	"Over the Moon"	Lea	3:57
13.	"Substitute"	Pete Townshend	4:19
14.	"Goin' Bak to Birmingham"	Lea	3:23
15.	"Mama Weer All Crazee Now"	Holder, Lea	4:57
16.	"Wild Thing"	Chip Taylor	5:17

Bonus tracks on Therapy 2016 CD reissue
No.	Title	Writer(s)	Length
14.	"21st Century Thing?"	Lea	3:13
15.	"Thank God It's Friday Right Now"	Lea	3:21
16.	"Am I the Greatest Now?"	Lea	3:51

Bonus tracks on Therapy 2016 vinyl reissue
No.	Title	Writer(s)	Length
14.	"21st Century Thing?"	Lea	3:13
15.	"Am I the Greatest Now?"	Lea	3:51
16.	"Misty Morning Light"	Lea	2:59
17.	"Thank God It's Friday Right Now"	Lea	3:21
18.	"I'll Be John, You Be Yoko"	Lea	3:26
19.	"Dare to Be Great"	Lea	1:55

== Critical reception ==
=== Original release ===
Professional ratings
Review scores
Source	Rating
Bubblegum Slut	favorable
Classic Rock	7/10 stars
The Last Word	favorable
Subba-Cultcha	8/10 stars
Trucking Magazine	favorable

Upon release, Bubblegum Slut said: "Therapy is an appropriately named, open-hearted, on-the-couch record from a man whose public persona has always been rather one dimensional. As a result there seems to be something of a watershed here; different styles and ideas are crammed in hectically and most songs feature some candid emotional outpouring. Therapy is a record which raises a lot of issues for its author - listen only if you're prepared for some seriously thought provoking pop." The Last Word described the album as a "fantastic solo record" and commented: "Of all the things I didn't expect to enjoy this year, a solo album by the guy who used to play bass in Slade was right up there at the top. It's been 16 years since Lea's last album but on this evidence he's kept up with both pop and rock. Especially if it's the sort of pop and rock that owes its very existence to Slade. A truly surprising pleasure." Robin Dart of Subba-Cultcha said: "Wonderfully crafted songs, it is an album in the true sense. On Therapy, James Whild Lea showcases his song-writing ability, by penning the kind of songs which are quite simply really well written. In a world of mediocre songwriters pushing albums on more style than substance this record harks back to the Paul McCartneys of song-writing, welding effective melodies to imaginative arrangements, and it is quite simply a joy."

Classic Rock stated: "Jimmy Lea was always the most enigmatic, talented and attractive member of Slade. Now pursuing a successful career as a therapist, his solo album seems to be more a labour of love than a stab at a comeback. Virtually a one man show a la Todd Rundgren/Roy Wood, Lea doesn't hide his influences, lyrically it's a universe away from the dyslexic musical football chants of his former employees. It's a treasure trove of lo-fi nuggets. And any album that name checks John Bonham and Phil Lynott in one verse has got to be worth the price of admission. Commendable and inspiring." Trucking magazine wrote: "OK, it's definitely not Slade Mk II - and it's not even The Dummies Mk II. It's light years from "Cum On Feel the Noize" but is not easy to pigeonhole, being a collection of tracks that are clearly the work of a multi-talented one-man band a la Roy Wood. Broadly speaking, it's a great album to listen to - and "listen" is the key word. You get the feeling these are personal lyrics, a genuine labour of love in both words and music - and because of that, maybe not necessarily a serious comeback in terms of chart success, but more a case of "doing what I like, how I like it". Jim promises more in the future and I personally can't wait."

=== 2016 re-issue ===
Professional ratings
Review scores
Source	Rating
Beat	favourable
Classic Rock	7/10 stars
Fireworks	favourable
Lancashire Telegraph	favourable
R2 (Rock'n'Reel)	5/5 stars
Shindig!	4/5 stars
Total Music	4/5 stars

Chris Roberts of Classic Rock wrote: "...he addresses his midlife crises with bold, ambitious pop songs, the scale of which suggest a Midlands Todd Rundgren or Brian Wilson. Lyrically stretching, they trade in solid rock tropes, which he's adept enough to re-energise, although once or twice you're not sure if he's aping or parodying Oasis. The live album gives you all the Slade rock-outs you need, but Therapy itself is a more thoughtful bag of thrills." Kevin Bryan of Lancashire Telegraph said: "The studio offering showcases a generous helping of the melodic Beatles influenced rock which became Slade's trademark during their glory years in the early seventies, whilst the concert package serves up an appealing assortment of golden oldies and covers, including loving revamps of such unlikely bedfellows as The Fab Four's "I Am the Walrus" and the Sex Pistols' "Pretty Vacant" to name but a few."

Shindig! commented: "For an album composed and recorded while Lea undertook a psychology course, what could have been an indulgent album, full of introspective navel-gazing, is actually a blast. Despite the preoccupation with self-exploration the album is full of brash and ballsy songs, with hooks and killer choruses aplenty. It seems the man cannot help writing belting pop-rock tunes, and can also knock out a pretty decent piano ballad ("Smile of Elvis")." Speaking of the 2002 Robin live disc, the review added: "Tearing through an incendiary covers-heavy set, the self-confessed "miserable one" from Slade sounds like he's having fun. Revelatory and immensely enjoyable." Ray Harper of Total Music said: "...he did record some songs that really deserved a larger audience ("Deadrock UK" could've graced any classic Mott album and "Go Out in Style" is only a Noddy vocal short of prime time Slade). A second live CD addition makes this a good time to check this out." Steven Reid of Fireworks wrote: "Jim Lea was always a superb songwriter and with Therapy, he may [have] delivered his most consistent set of songs ever which is high praise indeed."

Ian Abrahams of R2 (Rock'n'Reel) commented: "Don't expect something in line with Slade. This gorgeous album, luscious in sound and beautifully written and played has a resonance and depth to it. It's such an immediately likeable work, songs with memorable hooks, layered with great instrumentation and inhabited by haunting and heartfelt lyrics. Its great frustration is that it's a one-off, that since its original website release there's not been anything else. You'll want more." Jim Stewart of Beat said: "When I was about to listen to Therapy, I had no real expectations, just a hope that it didn't try to recreate too much of the sound of the old band, and fortunately it doesn't. In fact it's a good listen, with the 'Live' bonus disc brilliant. An interesting package of solid productions, plus a great live set, what more could you want."

== Personnel ==
- Jim Lea - vocals, all musical instruments (except where noted), strings
- Mark Viner Stuart - recording, mixing engineer, drumage, extra percussion
- Trevor Hallesy - recording and mixing on "Universe", additional engineering
- Paul Hodson - pre-production
- John Astley - mastering
- Heidi Bowdler - French Horns
- Vicky Adams - Oboes
- Rob Adams - Trumpet
- Andrew Kosinkski - extra violin on "Heaven Can Wait"
- Graham Carter - all Cellos
- Tony Clarkin - singalong assistance on "The Valley of the Kings"
- Paul Hudson - backing vocals on "Big Family" and "Time and Emotion"
- Andrew Sadowski - drums on "Deadrock U.K."
- Alan Barrow - cover photography
