= My Friend Stan =

- German/European cover of "My Friend Stan".

Single by Slade

from the album Old New Borrowed and Blue
- B-side: "My Town"
- Released: 28 September 1973
- Genre: Glam rock
- Length: 2:38
- Label: Polydor
- Songwriters: Noddy Holder, Jim Lea
- Producer: Chas Chandler

Slade singles chronology
"Skweeze Me, Pleeze Me" (1973)	"My Friend Stan" (1973)	"Merry Xmas Everybody" (1973)

"My Friend Stan" is a song by the British rock band Slade, released in 1973 as the first single from the band's fourth studio album Old New Borrowed and Blue. It was written by lead vocalist Noddy Holder and bassist Jim Lea, and produced by Chas Chandler. It reached No. 2 in the UK, spending eight weeks on the chart. The single was certified UK Silver by BPI in October 1973.

== Background ==
"My Friend Stan", alongside the compilation Sladest, was Slade's first release following drummer Don Powell's near fatal car crash in July 1973. The accident threw the band's future into doubt, however Powell survived and was soon able to join the band in recording material for their new album Old New Borrowed and Blue. One of the earliest songs to be recorded, "My Friend Stan" saw Powell still walking with the aid of a stick. He had to be lifted onto his drum stool during recording. After Lea had come up with the song's melody, the band's manager Chas Chandler persuaded him to complete it after he had heard Lea playing the melody on his home piano.

== Release ==
"My Friend Stan" was released in the UK on 28 September 1973. In the run-up to its release date, 250,000 advance orders were placed by retailers and, due to the high demand, Polydor had to import 100,000 copies of the single into the UK.

== Music video ==
The song's music video was filmed at Olympic Studios in London and portrays the band recording the song, with guitarist Dave Hill using his trademark Superyob guitar.

== Critical reception ==
Upon its release, Pete Jones of Record & Radio Mirror called "My Friend Stan" a "much slower Slade offering" and "really rather subdued". He concluded, "An obvious number one, and in some ways more memorable than some of the earlier rampagers." Deborah Thomas of the Daily Mirror commented, "One in the eye from Slade to prove the Wolverhampton stompers haven't lost their shine." John Hutson, writing for the Thanet Times, considered the release to be a "refreshing change from the Slade singles we have come to expect" and one which is "bound to be topping the charts within a couple of weeks". He described "My Friend Stan" as "quite a pleasant tune" and the B-side, "My Town", as being "much more like the Slade we are used to". Widnes Weekly News called it a "real change for Noddy and the boys", with the song being "much slower than anything they've done since 'Look at Last Nite' and very subdued in comparison with 'Skweeze Me, Pleeze Me'". The reviewer continued, "And, possibly because it is such a change, it is an incredibly refreshing single. No need to predict the reception!" James Belsey of the Bristol Evening Post described it as a "cheerful, breezy sort of bouncer", but felt it was "not really packing the impact we've come to expect from Slade".

== Track listing ==
7-inch single

1. "My Friend Stan" – 2:38
2. "My Town" – 3:02

== Personnel ==
Slade

- Noddy Holder – lead vocals, guitar
- Dave Hill – lead guitar, backing vocals
- Jim Lea – piano, bass, backing vocals
- Don Powell – drums

Production

- Chas Chandler – producer

== Charts ==
Chart performance for "My Friend Stan"
Chart (1973)	Peak position
Australia (Kent Music Report)	44
Belgium (Ultratop 50 Flanders)	7
Belgium (Ultratop 50 Wallonia)	8
Finland (Suomen virallinen lista)	10
Ireland (IRMA)	1
Netherlands (Dutch Top 40)	13
Netherlands (Single Top 100)	10
Norway (VG-lista)	5
Switzerland (Schweizer Hitparade)	6
UK Singles (OCC)	2
West Germany (GfK)	5
