= The Dummies =

- Origin: Wolverhampton, England
- Genre: Hard rock
- Years active: 1979–1981
- Labels: Cheapskate Records, Pye Records, Receiver Records Limited

The Dummies was a musical project formed by Slade bassist Jim Lea and his brother Frank Lea in 1979. Between 1979 and 1981, they released three singles and recorded a number of original and Slade songs, which were collected on the 1992 album A Day in the Life of the Dummies.

== History ==
After returning to the UK from the United States in 1976, Slade found their popularity in decline. During the "lean years" of the late 1970s, the band continued recording and touring, but were met with limited chart success and resistance on radio. Jim Lea wished to find out whether it was his and lead vocalist Noddy Holder's songwriting or simply a reluctance from DJs to play Slade material. He recalled to Chris Charlesworth in 1984: "Slade were passé and couldn't get any radio play at all. I wanted to see whether I could get radio play on my own without people realising the Slade connection."

By this time, Frank Lea had already convinced his brother to record "When the Lights Are Out" as a demo in 1978. Frank took the recording to London where it gained the interest of a major record label, who requested a proper recording be made. The pair then re-recorded the song in March 1979, with Slade drummer Don Powell providing tambourine. However, when the song was presented to the record label, they opted not to release it. Deciding to release it themselves, the Leas then formed Cheapskate Records. Frank wanted to prove that any independent label, with the right promotion and distribution, could release a hit single. Released in December 1979, the pair chose the name The Dummies for their project. The single's B-side, "She's the Only Woman", was a 1975 recording by a band Frank Lea was in.

With 1,000 copies of the single pressed, Frank embarked on a promotional tour across Britain in the effort to generate radio play of the single. He was successful in having the single play-listed on many regional stations. DJ Paul Burnett of BBC Radio 1 chose the song as his "Record of the Week", with the station actively playing the song for three months. It was also Radio Luxembourg's "Record of the Week". However, the single suffered from distribution problems. By the time it was re-released on Pye Records in January 1980, "When the Lights Are Out" was at the end of its airplay run and subsequently failed to chart. In April, it was given a release in Germany.

The extensive airplay of the single convinced the pair to record more material as the Dummies and release a follow-up. Although their version of Slade's "Nobody's Fool" was originally announced as the next single, the idea was scrapped once they had more material recorded. One of the songs, "Didn't You Use to Use to Be You?", was specifically written by Jim and Holder. Featuring Jim's wife Louise on backing vocals, the single was released in August 1980 on Cheapskate. Again the single generated much airplay. It was placed on BBC Radio 1's 'A' playlist and was listed a "Bullet Record" on Radio Luxembourg. In September, the trio appeared on the UK BBC1 show Multi-Coloured Swap Shop to perform the song. It was also chosen as Melody Maker's "Pick of the Week" during that month. However, distribution issues again resulted in the single's failure to chart. While it still retained airplay, Dave Robinson of Stiff Records offered to release the single, but negotiations broke down.

Of the songs recorded along with "Didn't You Use to Use to Be You?" were two further Holder-Lea compositions specifically written for the project; "Maybe Tonite" and "The Minute I Lost Control". Although the remaining songs were covers of Slade originals, one track, "Little Sheila", was not recorded by Slade until a few years later, when it featured on their twelfth studio album Rogues Gallery, released in 1985. "Maybe Tonite" was released as the band's third and final single in February 1981, which gained airplay but did not chart. Jim later recalled: "It proved that the songs I was writing were still viable. That was all I needed to know."

In May 1982, the Dummies recording "Poland", a reworking of Slade's "Lemme Love into Ya", was released by Jim Lea under the pseudonym Greenfields of Tong on Speed Records. Later in December that year, "Didn't You Use to Use to Be You?" was re-released on Speed Records under the new title "One Hit Wonder". Rather than the Dummies, the artist name chosen was the China Dolls. During the late 1980s, Frank was surprised how much second-hand copies of the Dummies singles were selling for. He decided to gather the Dummies recordings, which were released in 1992 by Receiver Records Limited on the album A Day in the Life of the Dummies.

== Members ==
- Jim Lea - vocals, guitar, bass, keyboards
- Frank Lea - drums

== Discography ==
Albums

- A Day in the Life of the Dummies (1992)

Singles

- "When the Lights Are Out" (1979)
- "Didn't You Use to Use to Be You?" (1980)
- "Maybe Tonite" (1981)
