= Cheapskate Records =

British record label

- Founded: 1979
- Status: Defunct
- Distributor: RCA (1980-82)
- Country of origin: UK

Cheapskate Records was a record label established by Slade bassist Jim Lea and his brother Frank Lea in 1979. It was active until 1982, however was later briefly revived for the release of three Slade singles in 1987–88. Aside from Slade, some of the artists on the label were The Dummies, The Ska-Dows, Sue Wilkinson, Roy Wood, Tich Turner's Escalator, Malcolm Roberts, Top Secret and The Glitter Band.

== History ==
Cheapskate Records was originally created to release a one-off single by The Dummies, a musical project formed by Jim Lea of Slade and his brother Frank. After recording a demo version of Slade's "When the Lights Are Out" in 1978, a major record label expressed interest in releasing the song, but insisted a proper recording be made. This was done in 1979, however the label then opted not to release it, prompting the Leas to form Cheapskate. Frank wanted to prove that any independent label, with the right promotion and distribution, could release a hit single and "When the Lights Are Out" surfaced in December 1979. The song achieved extensive radio play, but suffered from distribution problems.

In 1980, the Leas decided to continue the label to release other artists' recordings, and Slade's manager Chas Chandler joined the team during this time. Frank Lea handled the label's business and management, while Jim was considered the "musical man" and Chandler the "money man". The first release following the Dummies was the Ska-Dows' single "Apache", released in June 1980. The following single, "You Gotta Be a Hustler If You Wanna Get On" by Sue Wilkinson, was the label's first chart entry, reaching No. 25 in the UK. The Dummies' "Didn't You Use to Use to Be You?" followed in August 1980. Like their debut, the single generated much airplay and was expected to become a big hit after being placed on BBC Radio 1's 'A' playlist, but suffered distribution issues.

With Slade having suffered a period of low popularity since the mid-1970s, the band also signed to the label in 1980. Their debut on Cheapskate was the extended play Alive at Reading, recorded at the band's comeback gig at the 1980 Reading Festival. It reached No. 44 in the UK. The label also released the debut single of Roy Wood's Helicopters in October that year, although it failed to chart. The label's biggest charting success was Slade's "We'll Bring the House Down", which was released in January 1981 and reached No. 10. Cheapskate also released the band's album of the same name that year, which reached No. 25, along with the single "Wheels Ain't Coming Down", which peaked at No. 60.

In late 1981, disagreements between Chandler and Frank Lea resulted in Lea selling his share of the label and forming the independent Speed Records. Chandler continued Cheapskate until 1982, with the final release being The Glitter Band's "Heartbeat to Heartache", released in October 1982. The label was later briefly revived by the Leas in 1987-88 after RCA dropped Slade. It was used for the release of three of the band's singles; "You Boyz Make Big Noize" (UK No. 94), "We Won't Give In" (UK No. 121) and "Let's Dance".

== See also ==
- List of record labels
