= The Latest =

Studio album by Cheap Trick
- Released: June 23, 2009
- Recorded: 2008–2009 except track 2 recorded in 1976.
- Genres: Hard rock, power pop
- Length: 40:06
- Label: Cheap Trick Unlimited
- Producers: Cheap Trick, Julian Raymond, Howard Willing

Cheap Trick chronology
Rockford (2006)	The Latest (2009)	Sgt. Pepper Live (2009)

Singles from The Latest
- 1. "When the Lights Are Out" Released: January 18, 2009

Professional ratings
Review scores
Source	Rating
Allmusic	3.5/5 stars
The A.V. Club	B+
Chicago Tribune	3/4 stars
Hard Rock Hideout	(9/10)
PopMatters	8/10 stars
Spin	(7/10)

The Latest is the sixteenth studio album by the American hard rock and power pop band Cheap Trick, released on June 23, 2009. The album was produced by Cheap Trick, Julian Raymond, and Howard Willing and was issued on CD, as well as limited pressings on vinyl and 8-track tape. The Latest is the final studio album by the band to feature original drummer Bun E. Carlos, who left the band in 2010.

== Background ==
The track "Sleep Forever" was written in memory of a friend who died, "Miss Tomorrow" was originally a B-side from Robin Zander's eponymous 1993 solo album, taken from the "Show Me Heaven" single, while "Sick Man of Europe" was one of the band names used by Nielsen and Petersson in the early 1970s. "Everyday You Make Me Crazy" was originally written by the band as a Pepsi jingle from 1995 while "Alive" is a re-worked version of "What's in It for You", an outtake from the band's previous 2006 album Rockford.

Two music videos were created for songs off the album: one for "When the Lights Are Out" which was released on January 18, 2009, and one for "Sick Man of Europe", which was released on August 13, 2009.

== Reception ==
The Latest debuted at number 78 on Billboard 200, and number 36 on the Top Rock Albums. The album has sold 24,000 copies in the United States as of March 2016.

== Track listing ==
No.	Title	Length
1.	"Sleep Forever"	1:37
2.	"When the Lights Are Out" (Slade cover)	3:26
3.	"Miss Tomorrow"	4:11
4.	"Sick Man of Europe"	2:08
5.	"These Days"	2:44
6.	"Miracle"	3:47
7.	"Everyday You Make Me Crazy"	1:17
8.	"California Girl"	2:47
9.	"Everybody Knows"	4:16
10.	"Alive"	3:36
11.	"Times of Our Lives"	3:59
12.	"Closer, The Ballad of Burt and Linda"	3:00
13.	"Smile"	4:12

=== Outtakes ===
- "Bad Little Girl" (Original title & lyrics of "California Girl")
- "Rosie" (Later retitled "Roll Me" and re-recorded for Bang, Zoom, Crazy... Hello)
- "Untitled (Instrumental)

== Personnel ==
=== Cheap Trick ===
- Robin Zander – lead vocals, rhythm guitar
- Rick Nielsen – lead guitar, background vocals
- Tom Petersson – bass, background vocals
- Bun E. Carlos – drums

=== Additional musicians ===
- Julian Raymond – arrangements, additional musician
- Roger Joseph Manning Jr – keyboards
- Bon Harris – programming
- George Doering – acoustic guitar
- Luis Conte – programming
- Bennett Salvay – orchestration
- Jason Falkner – additional musician
- Todd Youth – additional musician
- Linus of Hollywood – additional musician
- Gannin Arnold – additional musician

== Charts ==
Chart (2009)	Peak position
Japanese Albums (Oricon)	84
US Billboard 200	78
US Independent Albums (Billboard)	14
US Top Rock Albums (Billboard)	36
