= Sue Wilkinson (singer) =

British singer-songwriter

Susan Mary Wilkinson (19 October 1943 – 4 January 2005), known professionally as Sue Wilkinson, was a British singer-songwriter. She is best remembered for "You Gotta Be A Hustler If You Wanna Get On" (1980), her sole hit on UK Singles Chart which was promoted by an appearance on the BBC's flagship music programme, Top of The Pops.

== Career ==
Wilkinson appeared on Top of The Pops on the shows of 14 and 28 August 1980, to perform her self-penned hit "You Gotta Be A Hustler If You Wanna Get On". Don Powell of the band Slade appeared on the drums. The single, released on the Cheapskate label, reached No. 25 in the UK Singles Chart. Sue Wilkinson presented a show on Raidersfm in 1988, then co-presenting before she left in 1989.

Wilkinson also worked as an actress and model under the name of Sue England.

Wilkinson later moved to Nashville and had success as a jingle writer.

Her book, Reflections of a Recovering Bimbo, was published in 2002.

== Musical works ==
=== Albums ===
- Looking for Cover (LP) on Hustler label in UK; catalogue no: SUW001 in 1980
- Hot Tea – Mood Swings (mp3) on Tyneville label in US; catalogue no: 1617 in 2001

=== Singles ===
- "You Gotta Be A Hustler If You Wanna Get On" / "Double Dealin' Day" – Cheapskate CHEAP2 1980 (UK No. 25)
- "Posers" / "Hollywood Sheik" – Cheapskate CHEAP9 1980
- "Time 'N' Tide" / "I'll Take What You Want to Give" – Cheapskate CHEAP17 1981
- "Women Only" / "Rich Man's Son" – Cheapskate CHEAP26 1981
- "Toy Boys" / "Extra Marital Affair" – Hustler SUW002 1987

=== Singles as songwriter ===
- "Toy Boys" / "Bad Loser" – Deauville STL7 1982 – recorded by Julie Walters

=== Singles as co-songwriter ===
- "Victim of the Planets" / "Dippers Delight" – Hansa 103-439-100 1981 Germany – recorded by Big Dipper & The Heavenly Bodies

== Personal life ==
She died in January 2005 of breast cancer at the St. John's Hospice in London.

She was a friend and colleague of the actress Sally Farmiloe, who appeared on the Wilkinson-co-penned song, "Victim of the Planets".
