= Merry Xmas Everybody =

1973 single by Slade

- Side A of the original UK single

Single by Slade
- B-side: "Don't Blame Me"
- Released: 7 December 1973
- Recorded: July 1973
- Genre: Christmas, glam rock
- Length: 3:44
- Label: Polydor
- Songwriters: Noddy Holder; Jim Lea
- Producer: Chas Chandler

Slade singles chronology
"My Friend Stan" (1973)	"Merry Xmas Everybody" (1973)	"Everyday" (1974)

Music video
- "Merry Xmas Everybody" on YouTube

Alternative cover
- Cover used for German, Austrian, Italian and digital releases

"Merry Xmas Everybody" (stylised as "Merry Xmaƨ Everybody") is a song by the British rock band Slade, released as a non-album single on 7 December 1973. The song was written by lead vocalist Noddy Holder and bassist Jim Lea, and it was produced by Chas Chandler. It was the band's sixth and final number-one single in the UK. Earning the UK Christmas number one slot in December 1973, the song beat another Christmas-themed song, Wizzard's "I Wish It Could Be Christmas Everyday", which reached fourth place. It remained in the charts for nine weeks until February 1974.

Released at the peak of the band's popularity, "Merry Xmas Everybody" sold more than half a million copies upon its first release. It is Slade's last number-one single and by far their best-selling single. It has been re-released during every decade since 1973 and has been covered by numerous artists. The single was certified double platinum by British Phonographic Industry (BPI) in December 2021. Since 2007 and the advent of downloads counting towards the UK Singles Chart, it has re-entered the charts each December. As of December 2012, it had sold 1.32 million copies in the UK.

In a UK television special on ITV in December 2012, "Merry Xmas Everybody" was voted third (behind "Fairytale of New York" and "I Wish It Could Be Christmas Everyday") in The Nation's Favourite Christmas Song.

== History and background ==
By 1973, Slade were one of the most popular bands in Britain, having achieved two number-one singles—"Cum On Feel the Noize" and "Skweeze Me Pleeze Me"—in three months. These singles had both entered the charts straight at number one, a feat unheard of since the Beatles with "Get Back" in 1969. During the year, manager Chas Chandler suggested that Slade write and record a Christmas song. Although the other band members were initially against the idea, Jim Lea came up with the basis of the song while taking a shower. After coming up with the verse melody, Lea recalled a song Noddy Holder had discarded in 1967, which he had written when the band were named the 'N Betweens. Entitled "Buy Me a Rocking Chair", it was Holder's first solo work. "Merry Xmas Everybody" used the melody of this song for the chorus, with Lea's melody as the verse. Speaking to Record Mirror in 1984, Lea revealed:

Nod had written the chorus of it in 1967. In those days it was all flower power and Sgt. Pepper and Nod had written this tune. The verse was naff but then he came to the chorus and went "Buy me a rocking chair to watch the world go by, buy me a looking glass, I'll look you in the eye"—very Sgt. Pepper. I don't use tape recorders, I just remember everything and if something's been written 10 or 15 years ago, it stays up there in my head. I never forgot that chorus, and I was in the shower in America somewhere thinking—Bob Dylan, Bob Dylan—and suddenly out came "are you hanging up the stocking on the wall" and I thought that'll go with that chorus Nod did in '67. So I rang Nod and said what about doing a Christmas song and he said alright, so I played it to him and that was it.

After an evening out drinking at a pub in Wolverhampton, Holder worked through the night at his mother's house in Walsall to write the lyrics, which he later described as a "family-based" "very working-class Christmas". He was also influenced by the regular power cuts across the country as a result of ongoing miners' strikes, which created the line "Look to the future now, it's only just begun" as an optimistic message that things would get better soon. He completed the lyrics in one draft.

Holder presented his lyrics to Lea, and the pair played the song to Chandler on acoustic guitars. Slade then set off on a sell-out tour. Ten weeks before the song was recorded, drummer Don Powell was injured in a car accident. His girlfriend Angela Morris was killed, and Powell remained in a coma for almost a week. After his eventual recovery, he was able to join the band to record the song. In 2009, PRS for Music announced that up to forty-two percent of the world's population could have listened to the song.

== Recording ==
"Merry Xmas Everybody" chorus
An excerpt from the chorus of "Merry Xmas Everybody"

The song was recorded in the late summer of 1973, partway through Slade's east coast US tour, at the Record Plant in New York, where John Lennon had just finished working on his album Mind Games. "Merry Xmas Everybody" took five days to finish, but the band disliked the first completed version. It ended up being re-recorded, with the corridor outside used to record the chorus, as it provided an appropriate echo.

In a 1984 interview with Record Mirror, Lea recalled of the song's recording:

We recorded it in the Record Plant in New York which is on top of a skyscraper. We said we needed an echoey room but in those days nobody went for this big, big sound that they're all into now. These engineers thought we were mad, they're going "no man", you know the Eagles, a very tight sound, Hotel California and all that pinging out of the speakers at you. I said what about the hallway downstairs and they went "we can't use the hallway, there's all these businessmen walking through for the other offices". Anyway we ran lines down to the hallway and there we were in September singing "so here it is merry Xmas" and we were totally unknown over there and people thought we were mad.

In 2018, Jim Lea spoke of the recording of the song in a Slade Forum Q&A: "The seasonal epic, as you call it, was recorded with me full of high anxiety. Don couldn't remember anything and no-one would rehearse it with me. They were against the idea. What you hear on the track is me playing bass, acoustic guitar, piano and harmonium as the track was built out of thin air, through lack of rehearsal. Dave conceded to play electric guitar. Poor Don looked on in horror as he drummed a single rhythm just to get it down. I knew it was good, but there was only one player in the team. Everything I tried out is on the record as Dennis Faranti (engineer) liked all the ideas I had. I dreaded hearing the mix, as we were on the road, while Chas and Dennis mixed it. I was relieved when I heard what was born from STRESS."

=== Composition ===
"Merry Xmas Everybody" opens with the introduction using a B♭ triad, a 7-second melody consisting of a harmonium and bass. The first verse then emerges in G major. This is followed by the bridge then the chorus. This sequence is then repeated once, and followed by a solo part sung by Holder ("What will your daddy do when he sees your mamma kissin' Santa Claus?"). The first sequence is then repeated, with the final chorus sung four times. On the last rendition, Holder screams "IT'S CHRISTMAS!" after the "everybody's having fun" line; the final part decreases its tempo and fades out to a D major chord played by the harmonium.

== Release ==
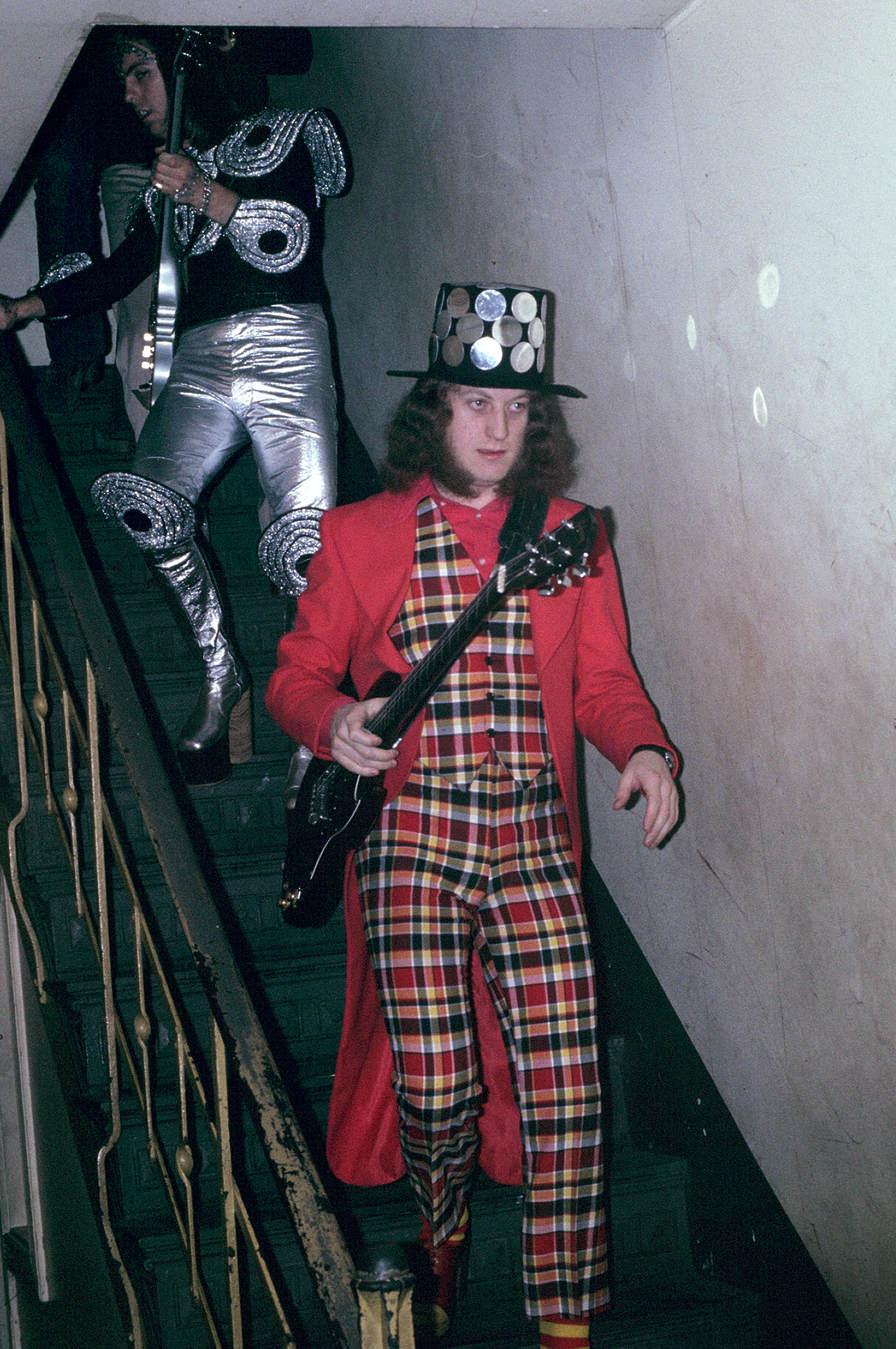
Noddy Holder in 1973, followed by Dave Hill, Slade's guitarist

On the day of its release, 7 December 1973, "Merry Xmas Everybody" was awarded a silver disc by the British Phonographic Industry based on UK pre-order sales of over 250,000 copies. It became the third song by Slade to enter the UK Singles Chart at number one in its first eligible week on 15 December 1973, the sixth number one of their career, and the fastest selling single in the UK. The single was in such big demand over the Christmas period that Polydor Records made special arrangements to have 250,000 copies sent from Los Angeles, on top of the 30,000 copies they were receiving per day from their German pressing plants. The song was the Christmas number one of 1973, beating another Christmas-themed song, "I Wish It Could Be Christmas Everyday" by Wizzard. "Merry Xmas Everybody" remained number one until mid-January, and stayed in the top 50 for nine weeks. That it remained in the charts after Christmas caused confusion for Holder, who wondered why people continued to buy it. The single received a gold disc at the beginning of January 1974 for sales surpassing 500,000 units. It eventually went on to sell more than one million copies, which was recognised by the certification of a platinum disc in December 1980.

The single's original B-side was "Don't Blame Me", which later appeared as an album track on their 1974 album Old New Borrowed and Blue. In a 1979 fan club interview, Lea said: "'Don't Blame Me' was a time-filler, I think that it was created as that. When it was used as a B-side, we didn't even know it was being used, it was chosen by the offices. We were in America recording the Christmas single, there was a rush to choose what to put on the back of it, and that track happened to be used."

On 18 November 1985, the song was given its first release on 12-inch vinyl, with an extended remix created by Lea and Peter Hammond. On 11 December 1989, it received its first release as a CD single.

== Promotion ==
No promotional video was created for the single as the band focused on extensive TV work over the Christmas period instead. They performed the song on various shows including Top of the Pops, The Les Dawson Christmas Show and Lift Off with Ayshea. The band performed the song again on Top of the Pops on 22 December 1983, when the song returned to the top 20.

The song was given an animated music video which premiered on the band's YouTube channel on 9 December 2021 (forty-eight years after its release), which was directed and animated by Matthew Robins.

A visualiser for the song was released on 24 February 2022 on the band's YouTube channel.

== Critical reception ==
Upon its release, Record Mirror stated: "When Slade get hold of a Christmas song, inevitably it's something different. Holder and Lea, that well known tunesmith duo, here on a gentler, more melodic, less rumbustious, guaranteed number one than usual." Disc commented: "There is no doubt that this slice of festive cheer will be a huge monster hit: the main question is whether it'll go straight to number one." Sounds said: "Noddy is in particularly fine voice and there's also some super-neat thumping bass." Melody Maker described the song as "another stomper" and "highly danceable". In a review of the 1977 reissue, Bob Geldof, writing for NME, stated, "Whatever happened to Christmas? Slade put the boot back into it, that's wot. One of our (the Boomtown Rats) favourite single bands."

== Legacy ==
"Merry Xmas Everybody" is played regularly at UK nightclubs and on TV or radio stations and in many supermarkets around Christmas. It is included on numerous Christmas-themed compilation albums and several of Slade's subsequent compilation albums. Despite the song's popularity it became the band's last number-one hit. The song charted in every year in the early half of the 1980s, and again in 1998 and every year since 2006. Peter Buckley describes the song in The Rough Guide to Rock as "arguably the best Christmas single ever". This opinion was reflected in a 2007 poll carried out by MSN Music, where it was voted the UK's most popular Christmas song. But even so, the song is virtually never played in the United States, having not been released as a single there in 1973. In the United States this song does, however, get played on Muzak.

It can be heard playing in the background during six episodes of the British television programme Doctor Who: "The Christmas Invasion" (2005) in Mickey Smith's garage, "The Runaway Bride" (2006) at Donna's first wedding reception, "Turn Left" (2008) inside a pub and a hotel in an alternate timeline, "The End of Time" (2009) in Donna's house, "The Power of Three" (2012) in a hospital and "Last Christmas" (2014) to keep a woman distracted from the monsters in the episode.

Noddy Holder has referred to the song as his pension plan, reflecting its continuing popularity and the royalties it generates. According to analysis of PRS for Music figures, it was estimated that the song generates £500,000 of royalties per year. The song has been credited with popularizing the annual race for the UK Christmas Number One Single.

== Formats and track listings ==
7" single

1. "Merry Xmas Everybody" – 3:26
2. "Don't Blame Me" – 2:40

12" single (1985 reissue)

1. "Merry Xmas Everybody" (extended remix) – 5:17
2. "Don't Blame Me" – 2:40

CD single (1989 reissue)

1. "Merry Xmas Everybody" – 3:23
2. "Don't Blame Me" – 2:40
3. "Far Far Away" – 3:33

CD single (1993 German reissue)

1. "Merry Xmas Everybody" – 3:23
2. "My Friend Stan" - 2:38
3. "Cum On Feel the Noize" – 4:18

CD single (Slade vs. Flush '98 remix)

1. "Merry Xmas Everybody '98 Remix" (Flush edit) – 3:44
2. "Merry Xmas Everybody (original version)" – 3:26
3. "Cum On Feel the Noize" – 4:23

CD single (2006 reissue)

1. "Merry Xmas Everybody" – 3:26
2. "Cum On Feel the Noize" – 4:23

== Personnel ==
Slade

- Noddy Holder – lead vocals, rhythm guitar
- Dave Hill – lead guitar, backing vocals
- Jim Lea – bass, acoustic guitar, piano, harmonium, backing vocals
- Don Powell – drums

Additional personnel

- Chas Chandler – production

== Charts ==
=== Original release ===
Chart (1973–1974)	Peak position
Australia (Kent Music Report)	55
Belgium (Ultratop 50 Flanders)	3
Belgium (Ultratop 50 Wallonia)	3
Finland (Suomen virallinen lista)	19
Ireland (IRMA)	1
Netherlands (Dutch Top 40)	3
Netherlands (Single Top 100)	3
Norway (VG-lista)	4
UK Singles (Official Charts)	1
West Germany (GfK)	4

=== Re-entries and reissues ===
Chart (1978)	Peak position
UK The Singles Chart (Record Business)	91
Chart (1979)	Peak position
UK The Singles Chart (Record Business)	91
Chart (1980)	Peak position
UK Singles (OCC)	70
Chart (1981)	Peak position
UK Singles (OCC)	32
Chart (1982)	Peak position
UK Singles (OCC)	67
Chart (1983)	Peak position
UK Singles (OCC)	20
Chart (1984)	Peak position
Irish Singles Chart	18
UK Singles (OCC)	47
Chart (1985)	Peak position
UK Singles (OCC)	48
Chart (1986)	Peak position
UK Singles (OCC)	71
Chart (1989)	Peak position
UK Singles (OCC)	99
Chart (1990)	Peak position
UK Singles (OCC)	93
Chart (1991)	Peak position
Dutch Singles Chart	73
Chart (1998)	Peak position
UK Singles (OCC)	30
Chart (2006)	Peak position
European Hot 100 Singles Chart	65
UK Singles (OCC)	21
Chart (2007)	Peak position
UK Singles (OCC)	20
Chart (2008)	Peak position
UK Singles (OCC)	32
Chart (2009)	Peak position
German Singles Chart	80
UK Singles (OCC)	41
Chart (2010)	Peak position
UK Singles (OCC)	50
Chart (2011)	Peak position
UK Singles (OCC)	33
Chart (2012)	Peak position
UK Singles (OCC)	35
Chart (2013)	Peak position
UK Singles (OCC)	49
Chart (2014)	Peak position
UK Singles (OCC)	55
Chart (2015)	Peak position
Poland Airplay (ZPAV)	61
UK Singles (OCC)	55
Chart (2016)	Peak position
Poland Airplay (ZPAV)	53
UK Singles (OCC)	30
Chart (2017)	Peak position
Irish Singles Chart	65
Poland Airplay (ZPAV)	51
Slovenia (SloTop50)	30
UK Singles (OCC)	16
Chart (2018)	Peak position
Poland Airplay (ZPAV)	82
UK Singles (OCC)	17
Chart (2019)	Peak position
Poland Airplay (ZPAV)	36
UK Singles (OCC)	19
Chart (2020)	Peak position
Poland Airplay (ZPAV)	50
UK Singles (OCC)	17
Chart (2021)	Peak position
Poland Airplay (ZPAV)	66
UK Singles (OCC)	21
Chart (2022)	Peak position
Poland Airplay (ZPAV)	44
UK Singles (OCC)	26
Chart (2023–2024)	Peak position
Austria (Ö3 Austria Top 40)	73
Poland (Polish Airplay Top 100)	42
Sweden Heatseeker (Sverigetopplistan)	15
Switzerland (Schweizer Hitparade)	99
UK Singles (OCC)	32
Chart (2024–2025)	Peak position
Austria (Ö3 Austria Top 40)	67
Estonia Airplay (TopHit)	57
Global 200 (Billboard)	137
Malta Airplay (Radiomonitor)	20
Poland (Polish Airplay Top 100)	48
Switzerland (Schweizer Hitparade)	93
UK Singles (OCC)	26
Chart (2025–2026)	Peak position
Croatia International Airplay (Top lista)	39
Poland (Polish Airplay Top 100)	41
Switzerland (Schweizer Hitparade)	86
UK Singles (OCC)	26

== Certifications and sales ==
Region	Certification	Certified units/sales
Denmark (IFPI Danmark)	Platinum	90,000^{‡}
United Kingdom (BPI) Physical release	Platinum	1,000,000^{^}
United Kingdom (BPI) Digital release	3× Platinum	1,800,000^{‡}
^{^} Shipments figures based on certification alone.^{‡} Sales+streaming figures based on certification alone.

== Cover versions ==
- In 1998, Swedish dance duo Flush released a dance remix under the name "Slade vs Flush". It reached No. 30 in the UK.
- In 2000, British rock band Oasis recorded an acoustic version for The Royle Family Christmas Special. It was later released on the 2002 various artists compilation NME in Association with War Child Presents 1 Love.
- In 2000, Steps recorded a version for the album Platinum Christmas and their own 'Steps Into Christmas' arena tour.
- In 2005, British singer Tony Christie covered the song and released it as a single on Amarillo Records. It reached No. 49 in the UK.
- In 2010, Scottish folk singer Karine Polwart released an acoustic cover as a single.
- In 2010, Glenn Gregory of Heaven 17 performed an acoustic version of the track on Paul Morley's Christmas Songs.
- In 2010, American singer-songwriter Brendan Benson performed a cover of the song for The A.V. Club's Holiday Undercover web series.
- In 2010, English and Irish musician Kate Nash performed a cover of the song for The A.V. Club's Holiday Undercover web series.
- In November 2019, American indie pop duo I Dont Know How but They Found Me released a cover of the song on their EP Christmas Drag.
- In 2019, Robbie Williams covered the song in a duet with songwriter Jamie Cullum for the former's Christmas-themed album The Christmas Present.
- In 2020, German power metal band Blind Guardian released a cover of the track.
- In December 2023, singer-songwriter Suzanne Vega performed an acoustic version of the song during her "Home for the Holiday" shows at City Winery in New York City.
- "Merry Xmas Everybody" was recorded by English singer-songwriter Anne-Marie and released on 14 November 2025. Her version, produced by Jon Levine, was made with a "softer and more modern approach" than the original. It peaked at number 72 on the UK Singles Downloads Chart and number 80 on the UK Singles Sales Chart.

== See also ==
- Christmas music in the United Kingdom and Ireland
