= Jim Lea (musician) =

English musician (born 1949)

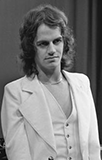
- Lea in 1974

Background information
- Born: James Whild Lea; 14 June 1949 (age 77); Wolverhampton, Staffordshire, England
- Genre: Rock
- Occupations: Musician; songwriter; record producer
- Instruments: Bass guitar; keyboards; violin; vocals
- Years active: 1966–present
- Formerly of: Slade, The Dummies
- Website: jimlea.co.uk

James Whild Lea (born 14 June 1949) is an English musician best known as the classic bassist of Slade from 1966 until 1992. As well as co-writing most of the group's songs, he occasionally played keyboards and violin and sang backing vocals.

== Career ==
=== Early life ===
Jim Lea was born at the Melbourne Arms Lodgings, Melbourne Street, Wolverhampton, Staffordshire, England, on 14 June 1949. He was the second of four children to Frank Lea and wife Edna. The other siblings names were - Raymond, Frank and John.

His family moved to Bilbrook, Staffordshire into the newly built homes during the early 1950s and then some years later to Codsall, Staffordshire.

A pupil at Codsall Comprehensive School – now Codsall Community High School, where he met his first love and future wife Louise (Ganner). He was extremely shy in those days, and kept himself to himself. In an interview many years later he said that he was probably somewhere in the lower end of the autism diagnosis range.

Lea's first musical love was the violin which he began playing aged 10. He was influenced by the French jazz-violinist Stéphane Grappelli, He joined the Staffordshire Youth Orchestra in 1961 and gained first class honours in a London music-school practical exam, before moving on to piano, guitar and finally bass guitar. He first played guitar, then bass, in the schoolboy groups 'Nick and The Axemen' and 'The Stalkers'. Before finishing school, Lea had been offered places from four Art Colleges, Hornsey College of Art, London being one of them. The Youth Orchestra had also offered him a place. Whilst waiting for replies he had also spotted an advert in the paper for a bass player with The N'Betweens band, so when college offers of acceptance came though, much to his parents and grandmothers disappointment, Lea chose to join the band.

His father Frank Lea was once the licensee of The Wheel Inn, Codsall in the late 1970s, early 1980s, before it ultimately was forced to close due to large groups of skinheads, punks, psychobilly and biker gangs congregating there, causing trouble. (Pub was later demolished 2 decades later in 2005 with new homes built on the site)

=== 'N' Betweens to Slade ===
Lea aged 16 went for auditions, bass guitar in plastic bag, for a local band, 'The 'N Betweens', of which drummer Don Powell, guitarist Dave Hill and vocalist Johnny Howells were already members. He was accepted and left school immediately. When Noddy Holder joined soon after, the foundations for Slade had been laid. Howells later left the band. In December 1966, the 'N' Betweens signed to EMI and their first single "You Better Run" was produced by Kim Fowley.

Chas Chandler, former member of the Animals and former manager/producer for Jimi Hendrix, spotted and signed them for Fontana Records in 1969 and their name was changed to Ambrose Slade. An album titled Beginnings was recorded. It was during 1969 that Lea wrote "How Does It Feel" at home, on an old out-of-tune piano with half of the keys not working.| In 1969, Ambrose Slade adopted a skinhead image and changed their name to Slade. Following their first chart entry with "Get Down and Get with It" in 1971, Chandler encouraged the band to write their own material, and the song-writing partnership of Lea and Holder commenced. In most cases Lea wrote the melodies, and Holder concentrated on the lyrics. On the follow-up to "Get Down and Get with It", "Coz I Luv You," Lea played violin. Out of all the original band members Lea had the most formal musical training.

In 1979, Lea formed Cheapskate Records with his brother Frank and made records under the name of The Dummies. In 1981, Lea began record production and produced some of Slade's recordings. Following their first chart success in America, Slade commenced a tour in the US with Ozzy Osbourne. Lea fell ill after only one gig with Osbourne, the band returned home, and the original line-up with Lea and Holder never formally played live again. In a Q&A session for his official website in March 2017, Lea commented: "Over the last six months I've come to regret not going back to the States after I was ill in 1984. We did one gig with Ozzy and that was it. We should have gone back!!!!! The emergence of MTV would have made a huge difference."

In a Q&A session for his official website in March 2017, Lea disclosed his three favourite Slade songs were "How Does It Feel", "Far Far Away", and "Coz I Luv You". He also identified "When the Lights Are Out" from Old New Borrowed and Blue as an album track he would have liked to have seen released as a Slade single.

=== The Dummies ===
Slade's lack of success during the late 1970s led Lea to wonder if their material would be better received if recorded by another band. In late 1979, Lea formed The Dummies as a side project, with his brother Frank. The group released three singles, "When The Lights Are Out", "Didn't You Use to Use to Be You?" and "Maybe Tonite". All three singles received plenty of radio airplay but sales suffered from distribution problems. "Didn't You Use To Use To Be You" was listed in BBC Radio One's 'A' playlist and was expected to become a top ten hit. Later in 1992, an album A Day in the Life of the Dummies was released, which gathered all the material recorded by the band.

=== 1980s ===
In the 1980s, Lea also produced all of Slade's recording sessions (except for some of the singles), and became an increasingly dominant creative force within the band. It was not uncommon for him to handle Holder's, some say Hill's, guitar parts on record. In 1982, Lea was also busy working on solo projects. Under the name China Dolls, he released the track "One Hit Wonder", backed by the B-side "Ain't Love Ain't Bad". "One Hit Wonder" was the same song as "Didn't You Use To Use To Be You", originally released in 1980 under the name "The Dummies", whilst the B-side was a cover of the Slade track "It Ain't Love But It Ain't Bad", from the 1977 album Whatever Happened to Slade. The same year, Lea released another single, "Poland", under the name Greenfields of Tong, with the B-side carrying an instrumental version. "Poland" was a reworking of the 1979 Slade track "Lemme Love into Ya".

In late 1983, Lea's bandmate Noddy Holder joined him in record production. Together they produced Girlschool's cover of the T-Rex song "20th Century Boy" and the album Play Dirty which featured two Slade tracks "Burning in the Heat of Love" and "High and Dry". The "High and Dry" track was originally written for Girlschool but still appeared on Slade's album that same year. Lea also produced the Holder/Lea penned "Simple Love" for the actress and model Sue Scadding. Released by Speed Records and with Lea's brother, Frank on drums, the single failed to achieve any commercial success. Initially the song was intended for Slade but no version by the band is known to exist. The B-side was another Holder and Lea composition, "Poland", which Lea released as a single himself the year before under the name Greenfields of Tong. In 1984, Lea also produced an album for singer / actor Gary Holton. Lea also played all the instruments (except drums, played by Geoff Seopardi) on two singles from the album; Holton's cover version of "Catch a Falling Star" and "That's How the Story Goes". Neither achieved any success. In 1985, Lea released his only solo single under his own name entitled "Citizen Kane". Written by both Holder and Lea, it featured Holder on backing vocals.

In 1986, Lea produced and performed all the instruments except drums, played by Lea's brother, on two singles by Annabella Lwin. The first single was a cover of the Alice Cooper hit "School's Out", whilst the other single was a version of "Fever", written by Eddie Cooley and John Davenport and previously recorded by Little Willie John and Peggy Lee, among others. Both singles failed to have any impact. Lea also produced two covers by the rock band, The Redbeards From Texas; a Beatles' track, "I Saw Her Standing There", and Slade's own 1972 hit "Gudbuy T'Jane". Neither was successful and the band's lead vocalist Steve Whalley later became the vocalist of Slade II. In 1988, Lea produced "Shooting Me Down" for the English hard rock band Chrome Molly. Written by Holder and Lea, the single received airplay on BBC Radio 1, but failed to chart due to a dispute between I.R.S. and distributors MCA Records. The band were unable to capitalise on the single and they soon split. The band held their third official fan club convention at Drummonds Convention, King's Cross, London.

=== After Slade ===
Lea left Slade after Holder's departure from the band in 1992, being of the opinion that Slade was all four of them or nothing. He entered the property business in 1993 and went on to study psychotherapy in 1997 although he did not take it up as a career. In 1994, he released the single "Hello Goodbye" under the name Gang of Angels, and a reworking of "Coz I Luv You" twice; under the names "The X Specials" and "Jimbo feat Bull". In 1998, he began writing and recording new material, and released the single "I'll Be John, You Be Yoko" in 2000, under the name Whild. In 2001, he was awarded the Gold Badge of Merit by the British Academy of Composers and Songwriters.

Since Slade stopped touring in early 1984, Lea has performed live only twice; once for a local protest against a motorway development in his home area, and once again in 2002 for a charity event at the Robin 2 venue in Bilston, near Slade's old local pub, The Trumpet. Later the gig was made available as a download-only live album and as on a second disc of his album Therapy.

In 2007, Lea released his first solo album, Therapy, which was made available on his website. It received positive reception upon its release and features Lea's own version of Slade's last single "Universe". In 2016, Wienerworld re-issued Therapy on CD and also released it on vinyl for the first time with bonus tracks. A new six-track extended play, Lost in Space, was released on 22 June 2018.

In 2021, Lea appeared on an episode of the BBC Two series Secrets of the Museum which followed the conservation and display of one of his original red lurex suits, at the Victoria and Albert Museum.

In 2023, the group that Lea had originally auditioned to join on 12 February 1966 – The 'N Betweens – were briefly reunited for a studio session and then a video session. The group this time around consisted of Lea, Don Powell, plus original members Mick Marson and Johnny Howells. Guitarist Dave Hill was not invited to those sessions. A first track to appear from the sessions, "The Train Kept A-Rollin'" climbed to number 3 on the Heritage Chart and was released independently as a CD single on the Noize Recordings label. Lea also appeared on a Don Powell Band single, a version of "My Sharona", and its supporting video. In 2024, a new Lea single "All I Want Is You" was released on by Noize Books and Recordings on their Jim Lea Music label. It also reached number 3 on The Heritage Chart.

== Personal life ==
Lea has always led a very private life away from music and has faced many unsettling experiences with fans intruding on him and his family at their home. He has openly discussed these incidents, emphasizing the importance of privacy and respect for personal space, calling on fans to respect his boundaries, highlighting the need for a balance between fan enthusiasm and personal privacy.

He has a home in London, England.

He married Louise Ganner on 19 March 1973 after meeting as pupils at Codsall Comprehensive School. They have two children, Kristian and Bonnie.

In the early 2000s, Lea put his music career largely on hold to help his mother care for his ailing father, Frank Lea. Frank was the former licensee of The Wheel Inn in Codsall. His father's condition progressed to dementia, which Jim described as "driving my mother mad". Jim noted that his musical career was repeatedly "punctuated" by stepping in to look after his father and support his mother. Frank eventually died from the illness in 2002.

His older brother Raymond, shortly after their father Frank's death, found out that he also had vascular dementia, becoming violent at times through the illness, with Jim becoming his full time care giver and putting his career and any future plans he had on hold once again.

In 2014, Lea was diagnosed with and treated for prostate cancer, which he revealed publicly the following year.

== Musical equipment ==
=== Basses ===
Lea started off with a Framus Star bass, similar to that used by Bill Wyman and later used a cherry Gibson EB-3 from the late 1960s until it was stolen in the mid 1970s. It is seen in Slade's (probably) first TV performance in 1969. Lea got the bass in exchange for a Gibson EB-0 that he owned. The EB-3 was refinished in white when Lea put it in with John Birch to get some minor circuit and servicing work done. Lea said that he only mentioned the refinish idea in passing some time previously, then John Birch went ahead with it without checking with him. The instrument was also modified with a third pickup located between its standard neck and bridge pickups. After the EB-3 was stolen in 1976 from the John Birch workshop, Lea's main bass was a similarly styled custom-made sunburst John Birch bass, given as a replacement. He also carried a John Birch J2 bass as a backup bass on some tours. Other notable basses that Lea owns include a Jaydee bass (which, uncommonly for a bass guitar, has a tremolo arm fitted), a pre-1981 Ibanez Flying-V bass (which was used a lot in the studio in the 1970s).

Slade often used hired/borrowed instruments in mimed TV performances. Lea used a Fender Precision Bass, Fender Jazz bass and a Rickenbacker style bass, made by John Birch, as well as a Shaftesbury replica of a 4001 bass for TV and video shoots.

=== Guitars ===
In the early 1960s, Lea used a Höfner Colorama before turning to bass. He has also said that he used to compose a lot of songs on his wife's old Spanish guitar.

=== Synthesisers ===
Lea owned an ARP 2600 synthesiser. He sold it on eBay in 2003.

== Discography ==
=== Albums ===
- 1992 The Dummies – A Day in the Life of the Dummies (Receiver Records RRLP 155 & RRCD 155)
- 2007 James Whild Lea – Therapy (Jim Jam Records)
- 2007 Jim Lea – Replugged/Official Bootleg of Jim Jam Live at the Robin 2 16 November 2002+
- 2016 Jim Lea – Therapy (reissue – 2 CDs including three new tracks and Live from the Robin 2 CD) (Wienerworld WNRCD5098)

=== Singles ===
- 1979 The Dummies – "When The Lights Are Out" / "She's The Only Woman" (Cheapskate Records FWL 001)
- 1980 The Dummies – "When The Lights Are Out" / "She's The Only Woman" (Pye Records 7P 163)
- 1980 The Dummies – "Didn't You Use to Use to Be You?" / "Miles Out To Sea" (Cheapskate Records CHEAP 003)
- 1981 The Dummies – "Maybe Tonite" / "When I'm Dancin' I Ain't Fightin'" (Cheapskate Records CHEAP 014)
- 1982 The China Dolls – "One Hit Wonder" / "Ain't Love Ain't Bad" (Speed Records FIRED 1)
- 1982 Greenfields of Tong – "Poland" / "Poland" (Instrumental) (Speed Records FIRED 2)
- 1985 Jimmy Lea – "Citizen Kane" / "Poland" (Instrumental) (Trojan Records KANE 001)
- 1990 The Clout – "We'll Bring The House Down" / "JimJam" (Instrumental) (Mooncrest Records JWL 1000)
- 1994 Gang of Angels – "Hello Goodbye" / "JimJam" (Instrumental) (Shotgun Records CDBOR 012)
- 1994 Jimbo featuring Bull – "Coz I Luv You" (Radio Edit) / "Coz I Luv You" (Bull Mix) / "Coz I Luv You" (Cowboy Mix) (Trojan Records CDTRO 9106)
- 1994 The X Specials – "Coz I Luv You" (Radio Edit) / "Coz I Luv You" (Violin Mix) / "Coz I Luv You" (Ragga Mix) (Receiver Records RRSCD 1010)
- 2000 Whild – "I'll Be John, You'll Be Yoko" / "Mega Drive" / "I Go Wild" (Jet Records JETSCD 501Z)
- 2016 Jim Lea – "Am I The Greatest Now?" (Wienerworld – download only)
- 2017 Jim Lea – "All Coming Back to Me Now" (Wienerworld – download only, CD promos exist – WNRDCS1001)
- 2017 Jim Lea – "The Smile of Elvis" (Wienerworld – re-worked version of the song – CD promo only WNRCDS1002)
- 2018 Jim Lea – "Lost in Space" (Wienerworld – download only, CD promos exist WNRCDS1003)
- 2022 Jim Lea – "The Smile of Elvis"
- 2022 Jim Lea – "Am I the Greatest Now"
- 2023 The 'N Betweens - "The Train Kept A-Rollin'" (Noize Recordings CD single NOIZE20231)
- 2024 Jim Lea - "All I Want Is You" (Jim Lea Music CD single JIMLEACD001)

=== EP ===
- 2018 Jim Lea – Lost In Space EP: "Lost in space" / "What in the world" / "Megadrive" / "Pure power" / "Going back to Birmingham" / "Through the fire" (Wienerworld CD EP: WNRCD5103)
- 2019 On 26 May 2019 Jim announced that he has been in the studio and a new single will be released in the Autumn, with an album to follow in early 2020.

== Videography ==
- 2017 Jim Lea – For One Night Only: Live at the Robin 2 (Wienerworld DVD)
- 2018 Jim Lea – An Audience with Jim Lea at the Robin 2 (in aid of Dementia UK, DVD)
