= Rogues Gallery =

Studio album by Slade
- Released: 11 March 1985
- Recorded: Angel Recording Studios, Portland Studios, RAK Studios and Utopia Studios, London, UK
- Genre: Hard rock
- Length: 43:29
- Labels: RCA (Europe), CBS Associated (US)
- Producers: John Punter, Jim Lea

Slade chronology
Slade's Greats (1984)	Rogues Gallery (1985)	Crackers - The Christmas Party Album (1985)

Singles from Rogues Gallery
- 1. "All Join Hands" Released: 5 November 1984; 2. "7 Year Bitch" Released: 14 January 1985; 3. "Myzsterious Mizster Jones" Released: 11 March 1985; 4. "Little Sheila" Released: May 1985

Rogues Gallery is the twelfth studio album by the British rock group Slade. It was released by RCA on 11 March 1985 and reached number 60 in the UK charts. The album was largely produced by John Punter, with bassist Jim Lea producing "Harmony", "I Win, You Lose" and "Time to Rock". For this release, the band set out to create an album of radio-friendly, potential hit singles which would be released as singles somewhere across the world.

The US version of the album, which was released on the CBS label, replaced "All Join Hands" with the band's 1981 UK hit "Lock Up Your Daughters" (which had originally appeared on the band's album Till Deaf Do Us Part).

== Background ==
After the band's 1984 breakthrough in America with the Top 40 singles "Run Runaway" and "My Oh My", the band were to go on tour that year with Ozzy Osbourne for six weeks. Prior to the tour, the band played a few warm-up shows. However, on the first night of the tour with Osbourne, Slade had to cancel the remainder of the shows when Lea collapsed after the first gig and was diagnosed with hepatitis. Coinciding with the breakdown of lead vocalist Noddy Holder's marriage, the band agreed to stop touring to allow Holder a break. Meanwhile, the band would continue to record.

Still contracted to RCA, the band set out to record their 12th studio album later in 1984. After the success of "Run Runaway" and "My Oh My", producer John Punter was hired to produce most of the album. The lead single "All Join Hands" was released in November 1984 and reached No. 15 in the UK. However, the following single, "7 Year Bitch", released in January 1985, stalled at No. 60 after the song's title caused it to be met with resistance on radio. The third single "Myzsterious Mizster Jones" was released in March and peaked at No. 50. The same month saw the release of Rogues Gallery, which peaked at No. 60 in the UK and No. 132 in the US. In America and certain European territories, "Little Sheila" was released as a single in April. It reached No. 86 on the US Billboard Hot 100 and No. 13 on the Mainstream Rock Chart. The album was a bigger success in a number of European territories.

Speaking to Kerrang! shortly before the album's release, Lea said: "I think this record has a more rounded quality than anything we've done before. For a start, we've actually gone in and demoed the new material before recording properly. The album is still heavy, lots of guitars, five and six-minute numbers, but everything sounds much more tuneful, meaning there are lots of potential singles on it. There are no long solos but there are some great guitar parts, hot and fast breaks."

Reflecting on the album to Kerrang! in late 1985, Noddy Holder stated, "I'm proud of the songs although I'd admit that the production wasn't all it might have been." He also recalled of the album's recording process in a 1990 fan club interview, "It became a bit of a saga, it took a lot of time and eventually turned out to be a great album although I feel there was something missing - something that is the Slade trademark was missing." Guitarist Dave Hill recalled his mixed feelings about the album in a 1986 interview for the Slade fan club, "I personally think it lacked something. I mean it was a good sounding LP, but maybe it had a bit too much quality. I think it lacked a certain amount of soul, or maybe guts. I think that maybe too many of the songs on Rogues Gallery sounded like pop hits, so the album began to lean too much to being regarded as a sort of 'poppy' album, and there is nothing worse than that for me."

== Recording ==
The album was recorded at Angel Recording Studios, Portland Studios, RAK Studios and Utopia Studios. It was mixed at Air Studios and The Workhouse. Before the album's release, the album's working title was Partners in Crime and the original sleeve design was conceived with this title.

== Promotion ==
During autumn 1984 and spring 1985, a full European tour was announced and tickets were put on sale. However, the band had not actually confirmed that they would tour, nor had any contracts been signed. Owing to Holder's existing stance on touring, the tour was soon cancelled. Had the 1985 leg of the tour taken place, Lea was considering adding a keyboard player to Slade's stage show.

Noddy Holder spoke about the tour in a 1986 fan club interview: "Although it was virtually me that cancelled it for the personal reasons - that tour was never confirmed. The agent and promoter started promoting it and selling the tickets, and we hadn't even confirmed that we were going to do the tour. The tickets had already been on sale for two months and nobody bothered to tell us!"

== Critical reception ==
Professional ratings
Review scores
Source	Rating
AllMusic	2/5 stars
Deseret News	4/5 stars
Kerrang!	3.5/5 stars
Record Mirror	5/5 stars
Record-Journal	B
Smash Hits	5.5/10
Sounds	4.5/5 stars

Upon its release, Garry Johnson of Sounds noted that Rogues Gallery is "chock-a-block with high quality power pop, glorious hooks, instant singalongs, ultra-catchy terrace-style chants and anthemic, hymn-like ballads". He added, "No matter how corny Slade become, they just never seem to lose that all-purpose pop knack for goodtime r 'n' r. Personally, I can give them no higher compliment than this: they are the band that young rock bands should model themselves on, instead of the likes of Judas Priest or US FM." Robin Smith of Record Mirror praised it as "another glorious celebration from Britain's answer to ZZ Top" and "unbridled mayhem of the best kind", with Holder's voice "still one of the most powerful weapons known to man". He also noted that Slade "have been plundering other people again in the nicest possible way and this time you might just find a few touches of Foreigner here and there". Dave Dickson of Kerrang! summarised, "What we're presented with here is ten songs that are each hung around totally brilliant choruses; you just can't help but want to singalong [with] Noddy every time he wraps his sandpaper vocals around one. Over the years that this particular 'rogues gallery' have been cranking it out, they've honed their art to perfection. This band has always been about hooks and here they're dripping aplenty!" Music Week wrote, "These old rogues display with this album their now 20-year-old commitment to persuading people to sing, dance and shout. Rogues Gallery, flirting on the edges of heavy metal, should achieve its desired effect nicely." Tom Hibbert of Smash Hits noted the band's "petty musical thievery" across the album, but added, "Never mind, though; those stupid spellings, crunching guitars, boozy lyrics and footer terrace growls are still intact and so Slade continue to preserve the status quo."

In the US, reviews were positive overall. Billboard recommended the album and commented: "Modern, muscular and metallic, Slade can hold their own on the present hard rock scene." Deseret News stated: "Slade is the epitome of a rock band: catchy melodies, infectious rhythms and the most enjoyable lyrical pacing in contemporary music. Rogues Gallery is one of the finest examples of rabble-rousing rock 'n' roll to come along in years... [and] a guaranteed winner." Record-Journal concluded: "The main problem with the album is getting past the first song. If you hang in, however, what follows on Rogues Gallery is some of the most enthusiastic hard rock in recent years, and some of the least annoying." The Press-Courier wrote: "Veteran quartet is long of toothe but still capable of blowing out amplifiers and speakers."

The Canadian Leader-Post felt that Rogues Gallery was a "neater effort" than the preceding Keep Your Hands Off My Power Supply, and concluded: "They may be long in the tooth, but they haven't lost their bite." Rich Harry of The Morning Call said: "Slade let non-of that I'm-old-there-fore-I-hurt guff gem up their fine new LP. Resembling Geritol on plastic, the album is a fine pop primer for enjoying life while approaching the gloomy pit stop of middle age." Mark Peel of Stereo Review commented, "Rogues Gallery is the musical equivalent of pub grub – a healthy wallop of bangers and mash washed down with a half-dozen pints of bitter. The songs slosh merrily around, their horsy rhythms and singsong lyrics spilling frothily forth in invitation to sing along. The more the merrier." He also noted the band were "derivative", with the album showing signs of the band having "plundered most of BMI and started in on ASCAP", but felt "familiarity is essential to bar-room anthems".

AllMusic retrospectively reviewed the album, which summarised: "Unfortunately for everyone, the decision was made to lay on a whole pile of keyboards this time out; the end result was an album that was far less endearing than Keep Your Hands Off My Power Supply. The rogues' gallery concept probably would have been a lot more convincing if the music had been stripped of the keyboards and overly slick production and given more of a rock & roll edge."

== Track listing ==
All tracks are written by Noddy Holder and Jim Lea.

Side one
No.	Title	Length
1.	"Hey Ho Wish You Well"	5:18
2.	"Little Sheila"	3:56
3.	"Harmony"	3:43
4.	"Myzsterious Mizster Jones"	3:35
5.	"Walking on Water, Running on Alcohol"	4:57

Side two
No.	Title	Length
6.	"7 Year Bitch"	4:15
7.	"I'll Be There"	4:31
8.	"I Win, You Lose"	3:31
9.	"Time to Rock"	4:08
10.	"All Join Hands"	5:31

2007 Salvo remaster bonus tracks
No.	Title	Length
11.	"Here's to..." (B-side of "All Join Hands")	3:10
12.	"Leave Them Girls Alone" (B-side of "7 Year Bitch")	3:14
13.	"Mama Nature Is a Rocker" (B-side of "Myzsterious Mizster Jones")	2:52
14.	"My Oh My (Piano & Vocal)" (B-side of "Myzsterious Mizster Jones" (12" vinyl only))	3:12
15.	"Do You Believe in Miracles" (1985 non-album single)	4:10
16.	"My Oh My (Swing Version)" (B-side of "Do You Believe in Miracles")	3:02
17.	"7 Year Bitch (Extended 12" Version)"	5:38
18.	"Myzsterious Mizster Jones (Extended 12" Version)"	4:47
19.	"Do You Believe in Miracles (Extended 12" Version)"	6:14

== Charts ==
Chart (1985)	Peak position
Canada Top Albums/CDs (RPM)	64
European Albums (Eurotipsheet)	46
Finnish Albums (Suomen virallinen lista)	26
German Albums (Offizielle Top 100)	38
Norwegian Albums (VG-lista)	5
Swedish Albums (Sverigetopplistan)	27
Swiss Albums (Schweizer Hitparade)	13
UK Albums (Official Charts)	60
UK Heavy Metal Albums (Spotlight Research)	10
US Billboard 200	132
US AOR Albums (Radio & Records)	17

== Personnel ==
Slade

- Noddy Holder - lead vocals, backing vocals
- Dave Hill - lead guitar, backing vocals
- Jim Lea - bass guitar, keyboards, guitar, violin, backing vocals, producer (tracks 3, 8–9)
- Don Powell - drums

Additional personnel

- John Punter - mixing, producer (tracks 1–2, 5–7, 10)
- Frank Barretta - assistant engineer (not credited)
- Brian Aris Design - photography
- Estuary English - artwork (design)
