= Ruby Red (song) =

Single by Slade

from the album Till Deaf Do Us Part
- B-side: "Funk Punk & Junk"
- Released: 4 March 1982
- Genre: Rock
- Length: 2:53
- Label: RCA
- Songwriters: Noddy Holder; Jim Lea
- Producer: Slade

Slade singles chronology
"Lock Up Your Daughters" (1981)	"Ruby Red" (1982)	"Rock and Roll Preacher (Hallelujah I'm on Fire)" (1982)

Audio sample
- file; help

"Ruby Red" is a song by English rock band Slade, released in 1982 as the third single from the band's tenth studio album, Till Deaf Do Us Part. It was written by lead vocalist Noddy Holder and bassist Jim Lea, and was produced by Slade. "Ruby Red" reached number 51 in the UK Singles Chart and remained in the top 75 for three weeks.

== Background ==
"Ruby Red" was written and recorded in 1978 but the band's original attempt at recording the track did not meet their expectations and it was left unreleased. When writing for and recording Till Deaf Do Us Part in 1981, Holder and Lea returned to the song, developed it further and the band then recorded it for the album. In a 1981 fan club interview, Noddy Holder revealed, "It's a number that we've had around for a long time. Me and Jim wrote it maybe two or three years ago. We first recorded it [at Portland Studios] when Chas was producing us, but we never managed to get it down how we actually wanted it. When we were recently looking through the songs that we'd got for the [new] album, we remembered that we'd never been able to get 'Ruby Red' down on tape properly, but that it was a good, strong, commercial song. So we added some new riffs to it and got it down. It might be in line for the next single."

== Release ==
"Ruby Red" was released in the UK on 4 March 1982. The first 20,000 copies of "Ruby Red" were issued in a gatefold picture sleeve with a special bonus single which contained live recordings of "Rock and Roll Preacher" and "Take Me Bak 'Ome". Both tracks were recorded at Newcastle City Hall in December 1981 and would later appear on the band's third live album, Slade on Stage (1982). Of note though; "Rock and Roll Preacher" on the live single includes the full introduction, which is edited out from the version that appeared on Slade on Stage.

== Music video ==
The song's music video was directed by Eric Boliski. It features the band performing the song on stage, interspersed with other shots showing a lady in red portraying the "Ruby" character in the song.

== Critical reception ==
Upon its release as a single, Peter Trollope of the Liverpool Echo noted that "Ruby Red" is "just Slade doing what they do best: playing it loud 'n' proud" and added it "should pull in the plays". Jim Whiteford of The Kilmarnock Standard praised it as "cheering, raucous, pop-rock held together by Noddy Holder's foghorn vocals and some simple but effective playing by the group". He concluded, "Just the number to wake the nation up after the spell of sleeping sickness inspired by 'The Lion Sleeps Tonight' chart-topper (yawn!)" Jennie Matthias, as guest reviewer for Melody Maker, commented, "Nothing like a meaty song with mindless lyrics. I shouldn't really like this but as I like noise I've got no choice with this record. Pure heavy metal. It's an obvious Slade single which means, shame, shame, shame, it won't be a hit." Alan Whitaker of the Telegraph & Argus noted that "Noddy and the boys still manage to produce a fair old riff even after all these years".

Julie Burchill of NME remarked, "A good old-fashioned beery belch of celebration – that's Slade's cup of nausceous rock and roll revelry. Is it uplifting or disgustipating? Well, you pays your money and you... are sick all voer your platform boots, either way." Mike Pryce of the Worcester Evening News commented, "Typical, lusty Slade with a song that's only just short of being a classic. Great hook line, but it gets lost somewhere in the middle, [although] Noddy remains one of our best rock singers". Sunie of Record Mirror was negative in her review, stating, "This lot can never reclaim their old turf and thus their old standing: it's just not there any more. Given this fact, I don't know why they don't have the bottle to go wholeheartedly HM, instead of dithering about in a sort of nomansland between their original terrace pop and real hard rock. 'Ruby Red' inhabits said terrain, and a pretty unimpressive effort it is too."

In a retrospective review of Till Deaf Do Us Part, Geoff Ginsberg of AllMusic described the song as "wonderfully Slade-esque" and a "good album track". In 2007, rock music journalist Chris Ingham considered it a "salute to a fun-loving girl who likes her food" and a "neatly constructed melodic rocker".

== Formats ==
7-inch single

1. "Ruby Red" – 2:53
2. "Funk Punk & Junk" – 2:57

7-inch gatefold with special bonus single

1. "Ruby Red" – 2:53
2. "Funk Punk & Junk" – 2:57
3. "Rock and Roll Preacher" (Live version) – 6:00
4. "Take Me Bak 'Ome" (Live version) – 4:33

== Personnel ==
Slade

- Noddy Holder – lead vocals, guitar
- Dave Hill – lead guitar, backing vocals
- Jim Lea – bass, organ, backing vocals
- Don Powell – drums

Production

- Slade – production

== Charts ==
Chart (1982)	Peak position
UK Singles Chart (OCC)	51
UK Airplay Guide 100 (Record Business)	70
UK Top 100 Singles (Record Business)	48
