= Little Sheila =

1985 single by Slade

Single by Slade

from the album Rogues Gallery
- B-side: Lock Up Your Daughters (North America); Time to Rock (Germany)
- Released: April 1985
- Genre: Electronic rock
- Length: 3:56
- Label: CBS (North America); RCA (Germany)
- Songwriters: Noddy Holder; Jim Lea
- Producer: John Punter

Slade singles chronology
"Myzsterious Mizster Jones" (1985)	"Little Sheila" (1985)	"Do You Believe in Miracles" (1985)

Audio sample
- file; help

"Little Sheila" is a song by English rock band Slade, released in April 1985 as the fourth and final single from the band's twelfth studio album, Rogues Gallery (1985). The song was written by lead vocalist Noddy Holder and bassist Jim Lea, and was produced by John Punter.

In North America, "Little Sheila" was released by CBS as the album's only single. The song received strong airplay in the US, and reached number 13 on the Billboard Top Rock Tracks chart and number 16 on the Radio & Records AOR Tracks chart. "Little Sheila" was also the band's last entry on the Billboard Hot 100, where it reached number 86. In Germany, the song was issued by RCA as the fourth and final single from Rogues Gallery.

== Music video ==
The song's music video was directed by Nick Morris and produced by Scott Millaney and Fiona O'Mahoney. It achieved breakout rotation on MTV.

The video features the band performing the song as part of a stage play, The Tragedy of Little Sheila, which follows the story of the titular character. The video is broken down into five acts:

- Act one – The Dark and Stormy Night
- Act two – Alone in Dollar City
- Act three – The Decline of Sheila
- Act four – A Strange Encounter
- Act five – Saved by the Law

Guitarist Dave Hill borrowed his old trademark "Superyob" guitar from Adam and the Ants' guitarist Marco Pirroni for the video.

== Critical reception ==
Upon its release in the US, Nancy Erlich of Billboard commented, "Proto-metallists are still bashing away, raucous and good-natured as ever." The radio programming guide The Friday Morning Quarterback Album Report remarked, "Predictability and consistency typically present themselves in the form of a double-edged sword – thus any new Slade offering required far more intellectualizing than one might initially realize. After much thought and debate, our experts have concluded that when it comes to power pop dynamics Mr. Holder's unique vocal presentation does in fact make the critical difference. We, therefore, unequivocally advocate prompt and thorough rotation for 'Little Sheila'." Creem noted that Slade "can still knock off the catchy rock ditty, playing hooky as usual with 'Little Sheila'".

== Formats ==
7-inch single (North America)

1. "Little Sheila" – 3:56
2. "Lock Up Your Daughters" – 3:28

7-inch Single (Germany)

1. "Little Sheila" – 3:54
2. "Time to Rock" – 4:08

12-inch Single (Germany)

1. "Little Sheila" (Extended Version) – 4:31
2. "Time to Rock" – 4:08

== Personnel ==
Slade

- Noddy Holder – lead vocals
- Jim Lea – bass, synthesiser, backing vocals
- Dave Hill – lead guitar, backing vocals
- Don Powell – drums

Production

- John Punter – production ("Little Sheila")
- Jim Lea – production ("Lock Up Your Daughters", "Time to Rock")

Other

- Image Bank – photography on RCA sleeve
- Mainartery – sleeve design of RCA sleeve

== Charts ==
Chart (1985)	Peak position
Canada Top Singles (RPM)	50
US Billboard Hot 100	86
US Top Rock Tracks (Billboard)	13
US AOR Tracks (Radio & Records)	16
