= Rock and Roll Preacher (Hallelujah I'm on Fire) =

- German cover of "Rock and Roll Preacher".

Single by Slade

from the album Till Deaf Do Us Part
- B-side: "Knuckle Sandwich Nancy"
- Released: April 1982
- Genre: Hard rock
- Length: 3:17
- Label: RCA
- Songwriters: Noddy Holder; Jim Lea
- Producer: Slade

Slade singles chronology
| "Ruby Red" (1982) | "Rock and Roll Preacher (Hallelujah I'm on Fire)" (1982) | "(And Now the Waltz) C'est La Vie" (1982) |

"Rock and Roll Preacher (Hallelujah I'm on Fire)" is a song by the British rock band Slade, released in 1982 as the fourth and final single from their tenth studio album Till Deaf Do Us Part. It was written by lead vocalist Noddy Holder and bassist Jim Lea, and produced by Slade. The song was released as a single in Germany only, where it peaked at number 49.

== Background ==
Following their revival after their performance at the 1980 Reading Festival, Slade signed a deal with RCA Records the following year. In November 1981, the band released the album Till Deaf Do Us Part. Following the March 1982 release of the third single, "Ruby Red", RCA and the band chose to release "Rock and Roll Preacher (Hallelujah I'm on Fire)" as a single in Germany only. For its release as a single, the full album version of the song was cut down to just over three minutes. The editing of the song was handled by Lea, Holder and drummer Don Powell.

The song peaked at number 49 in the German charts. Furthermore, the song became the band's regular opener at Slade's concerts. It would appear as the opening track of the band's 1982 live album Slade on Stage.

== Release ==
"Rock and Roll Preacher (Hallelujah I'm on Fire)" was released on 7" and 12" vinyl by RCA in Germany only. The B-side, "Knuckle Sandwich Nancy", was taken from Till Deaf Do Us Part and had been the album's failed lead single in May 1981. The 12" vinyl version of the single was Slade's second release on 12" vinyl. It featured the full-length album version of "Rock and Roll Preacher (Hallelujah I'm on Fire)" as the A-side.

== Promotion ==
In Germany, the band performed the song on the TV show Musikladen on 11 March 1982. Later in December 1984, the band would perform the song again on the German ZDF show Thommys Pop Show.

== Critical reception ==
Upon its release, Kerrang!, in a review of Till Deaf Do Us Part, said the song "comes close to capturing the feelings of Slade live, Holder chortling wickedly through every line". In a retrospective review, Geoff Ginsberg of AllMusic commented: "This number is so blistering, one wonders just how heavy these guys can get. Answer: very."

== Formats ==
7-inch single

1. "Rock and Roll Preacher (Hallelujah I'm on Fire)" – 3:17
2. "Knuckle Sandwich Nancy" – 3:09

12-inch single

1. "Rock And Roll Preacher (Hallelujah I'm on Fire)" – 5:34
2. "Knuckle Sandwich Nancy" – 3:09

== Personnel ==
Slade

- Noddy Holder – lead vocals, guitar, producer
- Dave Hill – lead guitar, backing vocals, producer
- Jim Lea – bass, organ, backing vocals, producer
- Don Powell – drums, producer

== Charts ==
| Chart (1982) | Peak position |
|---|---|
| German Singles Chart | 49 |
