= Dirty Foot Lane =

Studio album by Dave Hill
- Released: 30 October 2026
- Studios: Play Studios; Feel the Noize Studios
- Length: 41:59
- Label: Jerkin Crocus Promotions
- Producer: Django Holder

Singles from Dirty Foot Lane
- 1. "Play It to the Crowd" Released: 23 July 2026; 2. "She Had a Troubled Heart" Released: 21 August 2026; 3. "Dirty Foot Lane" Released: 28 September 2026

Dirty Foot Lane is the debut solo studio album by English rock guitarist Dave Hill of Slade fame, released by Jerkin Crocus Promotions on 30 October 2026.

== Background ==
For the majority of his career with Slade's classic line-up, Hill left songwriting duties to the successful writing partnership of his bandmates Noddy Holder and Jim Lea. Hill began writing his own material with Bill Hunt in about 1983 and first announced plans for a solo album in 1986, on which he would use different singers on different tracks. Although a number of demo tracks were recorded, Hill was unable to gain record company interest and the album project was ultimately shelved, although one single from it, a cover of the Everly Brothers' "Crying in the Rain", featuring Holder on vocals, was released by Mooncrest Records in 1989.

With the lockdowns of the COVID-19 pandemic in 2020–21, Hill was unable to tour with Slade and spent a lot of his time at home working on past songs ideas and new songs. He described it as a "productive" period for him and it led to the writing and recording of his first solo album. Hill avoided trying to create a Slade sounding album and opted to produce a "mostly autobiographical" one instead. Holder encouraged Hill to record a solo album, telling him that had been writing for a long time and people should hear the songs. Hill then ended up working with Holder's son, Django Holder, on the production of the album.

In May 2026, after signing a publishing deal with Notting Hill Music, Hill announced his debut solo album, Dirty Foot Lane, was to be released on 30 October 2026 through Jerkin' Crocus. He has described Dirty Foot Lane as "very heartfelt", adding that "they're emotional songs, about my mum, mental health, about love, my family, my home, my journey as a musician; it's my story."

== Song information ==
Hill has dedicated "Thanks for the Good Times" to his original bandmates (Holder, Lea and Don Powell), manager Chas Chandler, and "all the people who helped us make it". Hill wrote the basic melody for "She Had a Troubled Heart" years earlier but did not come up with a title or the lyrics at that time. Hill was inspired to write the lyrics after running into an old friend who told him her story about losing her son to suicide. He has described the song as the one "where I really found my voice". Its recording was done differently to what Hill was used to. He stated: "It required one of the trickiest things to put in music – space and air. It needed to breathe. It was about carefully creating and sustaining an atmosphere. It's more about layering sounds and blending than putting a sound directly down.". The production approach on the song inspired similar approaches on some of the other tracks Hill then recorded.

"Sweet and Tender" was written about Hill's mother. He has described it as being "about seeing her love for me more clearly and, as I never had a chance to speak to her at the end, giving her a loving farewell". "Only Fools and Horses" was influenced by Hill's experiences with the "unscrupulous people" and the "Roger the Dodgers" of the music business. "Play It to the Crowd" was inspired by Hill's love of performing live and the connection between a band and the audience. He stated: "I wanted the song to sound and feel like a live performance, as though you've just walked into a packed arena and – bang – the band starts playing."

The title track was inspired by the lane of the same name in Lower Penn to the south-west of Wolverhampton, in the area where Hill grew up and still resides. The song was originally recorded by Slade II for their 1994 album Keep On Rockin', but Hill chose to re-record it for his solo album as he was "never happy" with the original recording. Hill has described it as the "most autobiographical" song on the album and the "most important" to him. He attempted to record the song several times, but Hill was unhappy with the results and it was not until Django Holder made some suggestions that it took its final form. He stripped the arrangement back, creating something Hill considered to be "very atmospheric, beautiful and ethereal", and encouraged Hill to speak rather than sing the lyrics "as though talking to his children or grandchildren".

== Singles ==
"Play It to the Crowd" was released as the album's first single, with an accompanying music video, on 23 July 2026. "She Had a Troubled Heart" followed, also with an accompanying video, on 21 August 2026. The title track and its video was released as the third single on 28 September 2026.

== Promotion ==
On 29 October 2026, an album launch event was held at the Mount Country Manor Hotel in Wolverhampton. It included a live interview and Q&A session with Hill, a live performance of some material from the album, and a meet and greet, photo opportunity and signing session. A similar album launch event, minus a live music performance, was held at All Is Joy Studios in London on 4 November 2026, and was attended by Hill and Django Holder.

== Critical reception ==
Professional ratings
Review scores
Source	Rating
Classic Rock	3.5/5 stars

Upon its release, Neil Jeffries of Classic Rock called Dirty Foot Lane a "surprisingly mellow collection of 10 deeply personal and sentimental songs". He described the material as "primarily folky, bluesy and mellow, with a handful of gentle rockers", with "Play It to the Crowd" being the "most Slade-like". He considered John Berry's vocals to be "more convincing" than Hill's on the rockier songs, but noted that the standouts were the softer songs "thanks to lyrics that only a man of Hill's age and experience could write". He believed that, although "his voice might be thin", Hill's "sincerity carries the message well enough". He picked the title track as "probably the best" of these, a "nice song [with] shades of 'Gasoline Alley'", while the "sweetest" is "Thanks for the Good Times", an "affectionate tribute to his glory days".

== Track listing ==
All tracks are written by Dave Hill except "Back in the Air Again" by Hill and John Berry.

No.	Title	Length
1.	"Thanks for the Good Times"	4:12
2.	"Back in the Air Again"	3:41
3.	"Dust My Axe"	3:42
4.	"She Had a Troubled Heart"	4:34
5.	"Sweet and Tender"	5:41
6.	"Fast Train"	3:42
7.	"Only Fools and Horses"	4:01
8.	"Play It to the Crowd"	3:37
9.	"Reasons to Succeed"	3:34
10.	"Dirty Foot Lane"	5:22

== Personnel ==
Musicians

- Dave Hill – lead vocals (tracks 1, 3–5, 7, 10), backing vocals, lead guitar, rhythm guitar
- John Berry – lead vocals (tracks 2, 6, 8, 9), backing vocals, bass
- Rob Childs – guitar, dobro, drum programming, keyboard programming, plane sound effect (track 2), backing vocals
- Django Holder – bass, acoustic guitar, lap steel guitar, drum programming, synth and strings programming, backing vocals
- Izzi Archer – backing vocals (track 10)
- Jazmyn Barlow – backing vocals (track 10)

Production

- Django Holder – production, mixing, mastering

Other

- Steph Maclaren – design, layout
- Dave Hill – photography
- Rob Childs – photography
- John Berry – photography
- Anthony Keates – photography
