= Slade on Stage =

Live album by Slade
- Released: 3 December 1982
- Genre: Hard rock
- Length: 41:38
- Label: RCA
- Producer: Slade

Slade chronology
Til Deaf Do Us Part (1981)	Slade on Stage (1982)	The Amazing Kamikaze Syndrome (1983)

Slade on Stage is the third live album by the British rock band Slade, released by RCA on 3 December 1982. The album, which was recorded at Newcastle City Hall on 18 December 1981, reached number 58 in the UK charts.

== Background ==
Following Slade's performance at the Reading festival in 1980, interest in the band was revived and a major record deal with RCA signed. During the tour to promote the band's 1981 album Til Deaf Do Us Part, the band decided to record their concert at Newcastle City Hall on the RAK mobile. Produced and mixed at Portland Studios in London, Slade on Stage was released in December 1982 and reached No. 58 in the UK.

Speaking to Kerrang! in 1982, Holder said of the album:

"I think we've managed to keep the excitement of the gig virtually intact. It's true we had to do a few studio bits to tart it up, but these have been kept to a minimum. You've always got to remember that somebody is gonna pay hard earned cash for this record. And, whilst every effort should be made to preserve the atmosphere of a thing, if adding a few touches to it can enhance the final sound, then I think you owe it to the punter to do just that. With Slade on Stage, though, all we've done is to make up for bits where, for example, a guitar string broke or something. Oh yeah, and we had to cut out part of the audience as well, 'cos one of the microphones in the auditorium was set up next to a loony. He kept on shouting into it "bastard!" at the top of his voice, so obviously that had to go. But, apart from those things, everything is faithful to the show."

== Critical reception ==
Professional ratings
Review scores
Source	Rating
AllMusic	4.5/5 stars
Sounds	5/5 stars

At the time of release, reviews were overall positive. Malcolm Dome of Kerrang! described Slade on Stage as an album of "absolute earth-shakin' classics, delivered with an exhilarating air of kill-thrill from da boyzz" and one that displays Slade's "astonishing talents for 'working an audience'", with "an ability to control a crowd that defies belief". He concluded that the album had "restored my faith in the whole concept of 'live LPs'", but drew his only criticism at the fact that RCA had released it as a single rather than triple record. Garry Bushell of Sounds praised Slade on Stage as a "sensational album" that "goes some way towards demonstrating just why they're one of the best live rock bands in the world". He added that it is "one of the livest albums you'll ever hear, so raucously resplendent in rowdy crowd participation that it sounds like you've got the Kop in your bedroom" and noted Holder as "one of the finest rock 'n' roll vocalists that England ever produced". Bushell concluded, "What Slade have always been about is undiluted rock 'n' roll, and this album comes nearer to capturing the feel, the excitement and the sheer energy they generate than anything they've ever attempted before."

Geoff Ginsberg of AllMusic retrospectively described the album as a "monster", stating, "Believe it or not, Slade on Stage is the most intense recording Slade has ever made. That's heavy. This live album shows the band playing faster, harder, and better than ever. The first three songs set the stage. Slade comes out of the gate so fast that if they didn't follow those three up with a ballad, you'd almost have to take the record off. It's that intense. This is the tightest, hardest, and best you will ever hear Slade (or just about any other hard rock band) play. The material is the cream of the crop, and the recording is a killer. This album's only downside is that it only has nine real songs."

== Track listing ==
All songs written by Noddy Holder and Jim Lea except "You'll Never Walk Alone" by Rodgers and Hammerstein.

Side one
No.	Title	Length
1.	"Rock and Roll Preacher"	5:18
2.	"When I'm Dancin' I Ain't Fightin'"	3:42
3.	"Take Me Bak 'Ome"	4:32
4.	"Everyday"	3:18
5.	"Lock Up Your Daughters"	4:02

Side two
No.	Title	Length
6.	"We'll Bring the House Down"	4:17
7.	"A Night to Remember"	8:09
8.	"Gudbuy T'Jane"	4:39
9.	"Mama Weer All Crazee Now"	2:55
10.	"You'll Never Walk Alone"	0:35

== Personnel ==
Slade

- Noddy Holder - lead vocals, rhythm guitar, producer
- Dave Hill - lead guitar, backing vocals, producer
- Jim Lea - bass, backing vocals, producer
- Don Powell - drums, producer

Additional personnel

- Dave Garland - engineer
- George Peckham - cutting engineer
- Mike Robinson - mixing
- Andrew Christian - sleeve design
- Colin Newman - album title
- Partridge Rushton - typography

== Charts ==
Chart (1982)	Peak position
UK Albums Chart (OCC)	58
UK Heavy Metal Albums (MRIB)	11
