= All Join Hands =

Single by Slade

from the album Rogues Gallery
- B-side: "Here's To..."
- Released: 16 November 1984
- Genre: Rock
- Length: 5:30 (album version); 4:15 (single version); 6:15 (extended version)
- Label: RCA
- Songwriter(s): Noddy Holder; Jim Lea
- Producer(s): John Punter

Slade singles chronology
"Slam the Hammer Down" (1984)	"All Join Hands" (1984)	"7 Year Bitch" (1985)

Audio sample
- file; help

"All Join Hands" is a song by English rock band Slade, released in 1984 as the lead single from the band's twelfth studio album, Rogues Gallery. The song was written by lead vocalist Noddy Holder and bassist Jim Lea, and was produced by John Punter. It reached number 15 in the UK Singles Chart and remained in the top 100 for ten weeks.

== Background ==
Slade began recording Rogues Gallery in 1984, with "All Join Hands" being recorded at Angel Recording Studios with producer John Punter. The song, selected as the album's lead single, was released in November 1984 to coincide with the Christmas market. It reached number 15 in the UK Singles Chart and would be Slade's last top 40 hit for seven years. In a 1984 interview with Record Mirror, Lea said of the song, "It's another anthem. I come up with these on my way down to the chip shop. It just popped into my head while I was walking down the street. I don't have to sit down at a piano or lock myself in a cottage somewhere."

== Music video ==
Noddy Holder in the music video for "All Join Hands".

The song's music video was directed by Phillip Davey and was shot at Ewert Studios in London. It features John Otway of Otway & Wild Willy Barrett Really Free fame as the pianist. The video opens with a piano concerto played to a small seated audience in a posh hall. Holder soon enters the room, much to the horror of the audience, while Lea pushes Otway off the piano and begins to play. Hill soon appears to play the guitar solo on top of the piano. The stage lights up and drummer Don Powell appears. As the show is transformed into a Slade gig, the audience are seen to be won over and at the end of the video, they rush the stage after pulling off their evening wear, revealing Slade T-shirts.

In the UK and Europe, the video achieved heavy play on Sky Channel's Sky-Fi Music Show and was listed as a breaker on the Music Box channel. In their 10 and 17 December 1984 issues, Eurotipsheet listed the video under the "well aired" category for the most aired videos throughout Europe during the previous week.

== Critical reception ==
Upon its release, Frank Edmonds of the Bury Free Press gave the song a 9 out of 10 rating based on its hit potential but a 1 out of 10 rating based on his own opinion. He wrote, "Scarf-waving, beer-swilling party pub singalong, with a big sound and dramatic build-up. Like 'My Oh My' but even more commercial. Shamelessly aimed at the Christmas [and] New Year market, with an eye to further sales for the next five festive seasons. Words cannot describe how much product this could shift. I loathe it fiercely." Pedro of Record Mirror remarked that Slade had written a calculated "cheery-beery Xmas singalongaSlade epic" in the "all the lads at the bar swaying terrace style, hands joined and pint mugs raised" and "more the rousing chorus anthem type" than the "knees-up" "Merry Xmas Everybody". In reference to "My Oh My", the band's Christmas hit from the previous year, he concluded, "Recently, all the bookies drastically lowered the odds on lightning striking twice."

Penny Reel of NME described it as a "heavy metal ballad lout chant". Adrian Jones of Number One commented that, with the approach of Christmas, "here come Slade with yet another mawkishly sentimental singalong complete with piano and guitar solo". He continued, "The only problem is that they might be a teensy weeny bit too early. Never mind they can always release 'Merry Xmas Everybody' again. Bah, humbug." Richard Bryson of the Suffolk & Essex Free Press called it "another one of their turgid ballads" and "tailor-made for the singalong after last orders have been called". Derek Oliver of Kerrang! was negative in his review, stating, "Choked by the stunning similarity to the Eagles' 'Take It to the Limit' and the stirring orchestration, I could only push the 'reject' button. Slade, I'm afraid, have finally become a cropper."

== Formats ==
7-inch single

1. "All Join Hands" – 4:15
2. "Here's To..." – 3:12

12-inch single

1. "All Join Hands" (Extended version) – 6:15
2. "Here's To..." – 3:12

12-inch single (UK limited edition release)

1. "All Join Hands" (Extended version) – 6:15
2. "My Oh My" – 4:12
3. "Here's To..." – 3:12
4. "Merry Xmas Everybody" (Live & Kickin') – 3:28

== Personnel ==
Slade

- Noddy Holder – lead vocals
- Dave Hill – lead guitar, backing vocals
- Jim Lea – bass, piano, synthesiser, backing vocals
- Don Powell – drums

Production

- John Punter – production ("All Join Hands" and "My Oh My")
- Jim Lea – production ("Here's To..."), arrangement ("All Join Hands" and "Here's To...")
- Slade – production ("Merry Xmas Everybody (Live & Kickin')")

Other

- Tony McConnell – photography
- East St. – design and art
- Shoot That Tiger! – logo

== Charts ==
Chart (1984)	Peak position
Europe (European Airplay Top 50)	43
Europe (European Top 100 Singles)	55
Ireland (IRMA)	9
Sweden (Sverigetopplistan)	19
UK Singles (OCC)	15
UK Heavy Metal Singles (MRIB)	1
