= Myzsterious Mizster Jones =

Single by Slade

from the album Rogues Gallery
- B-side: "Mama Nature Is a Rocker"
- Released: 11 March 1985
- Length: 3:37
- Label: RCA
- Songwriter(s): Noddy Holder; Jim Lea
- Producer(s): John Punter

Slade singles chronology
"7 Year Bitch" (1985)	"Myzsterious Mizster Jones" (1985)	"Little Sheila" (1985)

Audio sample
- file; help

"Myzsterious Mizster Jones" is a song by English rock band Slade, released on 11 March 1985 as the third single from their twelfth studio album, Rogues Gallery. The song was written by lead vocalist Noddy Holder and bassist Jim Lea, and was produced by John Punter. "Myzsterious Mizster Jones" reached number 50 in the UK Singles Chart and remained in the top 100 for five weeks.

== Background ==
In a 1985 interview with the Australian TV show Sounds, Holder spoke of the song's titular character, "It's about a friend of mine from Wolverhampton who used to be a Hells Angel, but I changed his name to protect the innocent 'cause I don't think he'd like a song about him. It's not knocking him, you know, but it's a song about him." Lea revealed in a 1986 fan club interview that he came up with the song's melody while in conservation with his brother in a pub.

== Music video ==
The song's music video was directed by Phillip Davey and produced by Hugh Symonds. It depicts the band as gangsters in a warehouse which is being used for the production of prohibition whiskey, with the titular character being the supervisor of the operation. In their 22 April 1985 issue, Eurotipsheet listed the video under the "well aired" category for the most aired videos throughout Europe during the previous week.

== Critical reception ==
Upon its release, Marshall O'Leary of Smash Hits remarked, "I've never been a great lover of Slade's "orl-ta-geth-ah nah" heavy metal style, however I found myself humming along to it. Not as good as 'My Oh My' but one of their classiest singles yet." Jerry Smith of Music Week considered it to be a "typical riotous rocker with a catchy Noddy Holder vocal delivered over a wall of guitars and a thundering beat". He added that it has a "rather American style production but is likely to do well". Barry McIlheney, writing for Melody Maker, described the song as "an awful lot better than their recent spate of pub closing-time anthems" and added that "Sir Nod Holder still has the finest set of lungs this side of Princess Margaret".

The Fife Free Press praised it as "great stuff" and added, "Noddy and the lads should have a fair sized hit on their hands with this thundering piece of good time rock." John W. Milne of the Banffshire Journal called it "truly brilliant" from a band who "keep coming up with some of the best music around". Paul Simper of Number One wrote, "Could be some ghostbusting going on here. 'Mister Jones' is a dead ringer for Kim Wilde's 'Cambodia' with more than a touch of Leo Sayer's 'Moonlighting' thrown in. Maybe that's why the song's alright. Maybe that's why it doesn't sound like Slade. Maybe it's time they gave Ray Parker Junior a call..."

Kerrang! considered it to be "far from a klassik Slade stomper", but felt it was "a nice enough break from their recent scarf-wavers". Peter Kinghorn of the Evening Chronicle described the song as "rampant if not quite as good as their usual". John Marsden of the Derby Evening Telegraph was critical, writing, "Slade seem to have been producing singles like their new one for a lifetime. Lea and Holder occasionally turn out a song which is a cut above the average – this is not it."

== Formats ==
7-inch single (UK, Europe and Australasia)

1. "Myzsterious Mizster Jones" – 3:37
2. "Mama Nature is a Rocker" – 2:52

12-inch single (UK, Europe and Australasia)

1. "Myzsterious Mizster Jones" (Extended Version) – 4:47
2. "Mama Nature is a Rocker" – 2:52
3. "My Oh My" (Piano & Vocal Version) – 3:11

== Personnel ==
Slade

- Noddy Holder – lead vocals
- Jim Lea – bass, synthesiser, backing vocals
- Dave Hill – lead guitar, backing vocals
- Don Powell – drums

Production

- John Punter – production ("Myzsterious Mizster Jones")
- Jim Lea – production ("Mama Nature Is a Rocker" and "My Oh My (Piano & Vocal)")

Other

- Green Ink – design
- Alan Ballard – photography

== Charts ==
Chart (1985)	Peak position
UK Singles Chart	50
UK Heavy Metal Singles (Spotlight Research)	6
