= 7 Year Bitch (song) =

Single by Slade

from the album Rogues Gallery
- B-side: "Leave Them Girls Alone"
- Released: 18 January 1985
- Length: 4:14 (album version); 3:58 (single version); 5:38 (extended version)
- Label: RCA
- Songwriters: Noddy Holder; Jim Lea
- Producer: John Punter

Slade singles chronology
"All Join Hands" (1984)	"7 Year Bitch" (1985)	"Myzsterious Mizster Jones" (1985)

Audio sample
- file; help

"7 Year Bitch" is a song by English rock band Slade, released in 1985 as the second single from their twelfth studio album, Rogues Gallery. The song was written by lead vocalist Noddy Holder and bassist Jim Lea, and was produced by John Punter. It reached number 60 in the UK Singles Chart and remained in the top 100 for three weeks.

== Release ==
"7 Year Bitch" was released in the UK on 18 January 1985. Following the top 20 success of their late 1984 single "All Join Hands", both the band and RCA had high expectations for "7 Year Bitch", but it failed to replicate the success and stalled at number 60 in the UK Singles Chart. Its disappointing sales were blamed on the song's title which discouraged some radio stations from playing the song. In a 1998 interview, Noddy Holder recalled, "That was a hit record, but we got a bit of a backlash".

== Music video ==
The song's music video was directed by Phillip Davey and produced by Hugh Symonds. It was shot at Ewert Studios in London and features Slade performing the song in a large orange tent, intercut with scenes of the band interacting with a group of women, as well as a couple of shots of the band dressed in convict outfits. When filming the scene where the band join the women for a tea party, Davey suggested they should all have a pie fight. He intentionally told the band he would tell them when to start while also secretly telling the women to start whenever they like so that the band were hit in the face first. Recalling the scene in 1986, Jim Lea remembered the fight was in good humour but was also quite rough. Both Lea and guitarist Dave Hill suffered some cuts and there are frames in the video which show Lea's face covered in blood.

In a 1985 interview on the Music Box show First Sight, Holder said of the video, "We really wanted a lot of colour. It was the director's idea to have this sort of Alice in Wonderland type set. I think it's come off good. In our videos we like to get our personalities across more than having a big extravanganza thing. As long as the humour of the band comes across, we don't care what goes on round about, 'cause it's all icing on the cake."

In the UK and Europe, it achieved heavy play on both Sky Channel's Sky-Fi Music Show and the Music Box channel. In their 11 March 1985 issue, Eurotipsheet listed the video under the "video hits" category for the most aired videos throughout Europe during the previous week.

== Critical reception ==
Upon its release as a single, Eleanor Levy of Record Mirror remarked that "7 Year Bitch" "sounds like Slade" and noted that it is "a bit faster" than "My Oh My" and "a bit slower" than "Mama Weer All Crazee Now". She concluded that it would be "a hit no doubt". Phil Murphy of The Journal praised it as a "roistering gem of a mindless, chart bound single" and added, "[It's] virtually impossible to dislike this one. Slade are back on form." Radio Luxembourg DJ Mike Hollis, writing for the Daily Mirror, described the song as a "good follow-up" to "All Join Hands" and believed the band "should make it again with this one". He added, "It has a very familiar hook to it, but I can't think what it is."

Garry Bushell of Sounds called it "pure pop for pissed people" and noted that the "mid-tempo mover" has "one of those choruses you hate yerself for waking up singing", "infuriatingly familiar 'woah-oh-woah-etc' embroidery", and verses "so like solo Lennon after he'd gone soppy that young Julian will be kicking himself for not nicking 'em first". He added that while it "may lack the brawn of early terrace tirade days", the song "does manage to nearly side-step the sway-along rut they've got stuck in of late" and concluded Slade "still [have] an inimitable knack for knock-about tunes that just bubble with big grins and double gins". The Fife Free Press praised it as an "immensely enjoyable singalong anthem" and a "real toe-tapper of a single destined for a high chart position". Frank Edmonds of the Bury Free Press gave the single a 6 out of 10 rating and wrote, "One of those infuriating songs which you hear and think: 'AAAAAAARRGGHH! NO!! TURN IT OFF!!' Then a week later you have to admit it's so catchy you really like bits of it. Definitely one to get them swaying on pop's terraces." Iain Ballantyne, writing for the Bridport and Lyme Regis News, believed the song was "certainly an improvement" musically on "All Join Hands". He added, "Whether or not feminists will appreciate the humour of it all remains to be seen."

Frank Hopkinson of Number One commented, "Those lovable old singalong merchants, heavy metal's answer to Black Lace, have been out robbing graves again. This time they've sneaked into the music vaults and dug up a tune which last saw the light of day on 10cc's 'The Things We Do for Love'." Vici MacDonald of Smash Hits remarked, "Oh no, not another Slade record. Honestly, these days you just can't move for clapped out old glam-rock veterans clogging up the charts. I mean, Slade, Alvin Stardust and Wizzard were all very well in their day, but rather than being content to retire gracefully, they insist on becoming dodgy cabaret artists and releasing horribly jolly sing-a-long thingies like this." Malcolm Dome of Kerrang! considered "7 Year Bitch" to be "a barely listenable rip-off of 'All Join Hands' which ripped off 'My Oh My', which stole liberally from 'Everyday'" and concluded, "Much as I love Slade, this sucks an almighty limp one."

== Formats ==
7-inch single (UK, Germany and Japan)

1. "7 Year Bitch" – 3:58
2. "Leave Them Girls Alone" – 3:13

12-inch single (UK, Germany and Australasia)

1. "7 Year Bitch" (Extended Version) – 5:38
2. "Leave Them Girls Alone" – 3:13
3. "We'll Bring the House Down" (Live Version) – 4:33

== Personnel ==
Slade

- Noddy Holder – lead vocals
- Jim Lea – bass, synthesiser, backing vocals, arranger
- Dave Hill – lead guitar, backing vocals
- Don Powell – drums

Production

- John Punter – production ("7 Year Bitch")
- Jim Lea – production ("Leave Them Girls Alone", "We'll Bring the House Down")

Other

- The Square Red Studio – design
- Chris Thomson – front photography
- Simon Fowler – back photography

== Charts ==
Chart (1985)	Peak position
UK Singles Chart (OCC)	60
UK Heavy Metal Singles (MRIB)	6
West Germany (Official German Charts)	39
