= Highfields School, Wolverhampton =

Highfields Academy

Location
- Penn; Wolverhampton, West Midlands, WV4 4NT; England; 52.5652°N 2.1764°W

Information
- Type: Academy
- Established: 1967
- Local authority: Wolverhampton City Council
- Department for Education URN: 142317 Tables
- Ofsted: Reports
- Headteacher: S. Cope
- Gender: Mixed
- Age: 11 to 19
- Enrolment: ~1500
- Colours: black, maroon, grey and yellow.
- Website: www.hswv.org.uk

Highfields School is a mixed secondary school and sixth form in the Penn area of Wolverhampton, in the West Midlands of England. It was formed in 1957 and accommodates over 1,500 pupils. There is an environmental centre at the back of the school, which as well as lessons, holds many meetings and gatherings for astronomy or the council.

The school was re-built as part of a BSF project and the previous building was demolished. Construction started in 2010 and the build was completed in 2012, with landscaping finished in 2013. The school finished a week early for the six weeks holiday and staggered the pupils back into the new school, starting sixth form down to year 7. Upon moving into the new school the uniform was redesigned. With the move into the new establishment the school changed its title from 'Highfields Science Specialist School' to 'Highfields School'.

Previously a community school administered by Wolverhampton City Council, in December 2015 Highfields School converted to academy status. The school continues to coordinate with Wolverhampton City Council for admissions.

== Inspections ==
As of 2024, the school's most recent inspection by Ofsted was in 2021, with a judgement of Good.

== Notable former pupils ==
- Dave Hill, musician
- Beverley Knight, singer, songwriter, actress and radio personality
