= Knuckle Sandwich Nancy =

Single by Slade

from the album Till Deaf Do Us Part
- B-side: "I'm Mad"
- Released: 15 May 1981
- Length: 3:14
- Label: Cheapskate
- Songwriters: Noddy Holder; Jim Lea
- Producer: Slade

Slade singles chronology
"Wheels Ain't Coming Down" (1981)	"Knuckle Sandwich Nancy" (1981)	"Lock Up Your Daughters" (1981)

"Knuckle Sandwich Nancy" is a song by English rock band Slade, released by Cheapskate on 15 May 1981 as the lead single from their tenth studio album, Till Deaf Do Us Part. The song was written by band members Noddy Holder and Jim Lea, and was produced by Slade. "Knuckle Sandwich Nancy" failed to enter the UK Singles Chart, but did reach number 101 in the Record Business Bubbling Under Singles chart.

== Background ==
Speaking to The New Standard in 1981, lead vocalist Noddy Holder revealed of the song's lyrics, "It's about a bird we used to know years ago whose answer to everything was to knock fellows about. She used to ask guys for a drink and when they wouldn't buy her one she would pounce on them. She was a real character."

== Release ==
"Knuckle Sandwich Nancy" was released as a single in the wake of the band's commercial comeback after a well-received performance at the Reading Festival in 1980. They once again began to receive attention in the British music press and scored their first top 10 hit in over five years with "We'll Bring the House Down" in early 1981. "Knuckle Sandwich Nancy" was released on 15 May 1981 on the independent label Cheapskate, which was operated by bassist Jim Lea, his brother Frank and Slade's manager Chas Chandler. The single's distribution was handled by RCA.

It was Slade's insistence that "Knuckle Sandwich Nancy" should be released as a single, but Chandler and RCA were not as enthusiastic. Chandler recalled in 1984, "I begged them not to put it out. RCA hated it but the group insisted on it... I knew it would be a disaster and so did RCA. They were convinced about the thing. I hated it." Despite the band's revival, "Knuckle Sandwich Nancy" failed to enter the UK Singles Chart. At a time when their relations with Chandler were already strained, the failure of the single resulted in the end of their 12-year partnership. Noddy Holder recalled in 1984, "There was a big cock-up over the release of that single. We were in Germany at the time and when we came back no one at RCA seemed to know whether it was going to be released or not. It was chaotic. We put the blame [of the single's failure] on Chas. He was head of the label and he was our manager. It was a manager's responsibility and it just brought things to a head." Chandler's last undertaking for Slade was negotiating the contract when they signed directly to RCA in the summer of 1981.

The single generated some controversy with the One Parent Family Association upon its release. Some members of the association suggested that the song's lyrics were "advocating husband battering", but the band denied this, with Holder commenting, "It's only a song. I don't think it should be taken too seriously."

== Critical reception ==
Upon its release, Evening Chronicle remarked, "Subtle it isn't, but another healthy dose of stomp-along rock from the veterans." Celia Barlow of the Telegraph & Argus stated, "Slade has not changed very much, and this fast heavy rock and roll is quite a good example of their style. Funny lyrics, good instrumentals, and Holders' incomparable vocals. But musical originality – no." Philip Booth of the Bolton Evening News called it "another cheeky-boy romp that leaves the likes of Madness a million miles behind". He added, "The aim, it seems, is simply to keep up with Noddy as he speeds along like Carlos Reutemann". Music & Video Week picked the single as a "chart cert" in their 30 May 1981 issue. In 2007, rock music journalist Chris Ingham described the song as a "drum-led frenzy" and added it was "very much [the] son" of "We'll Bring the House Down". He felt that, although the song failed as a single, it "worked wonderfully well as the penultimate track on Till Deaf Do Us Part".

== Track listing ==
7-inch single

1. "Knuckle Sandwich Nancy" – 3:14
2. "I'm Mad" – 2:47

== Personnel ==
Slade

- Noddy Holder – lead vocals, rhythm guitar
- Dave Hill – lead guitar, backing vocals
- Jim Lea – bass, backing vocals
- Don Powell – drums

Production

- Slade – production

== Charts ==
Chart (1981)	Peak position
UK Bubbling Under Singles (Record Business)	101
