= Keep On Rockin' (Slade II album) =

Keep on Rockin!

Studio album by Slade II
- Released: November 1994
- Genre: Rock
- Length: 38:32
- Label: Play That Beat!, Columbia, Prestige Records
- Producer: Paul Despidgeleare

Singles from Keep on Rockin'
- 1. "Hot Luv" Released: March 1995; 2. "Black and White World" Released: July 1995

Keep on Rockin! is the only studio album by Slade II. The album was released in 1994 and has seen various re-issues and guises under alternative names such as Wild Nites (1999), Cum on Let's Party! (2002) and Superyob (2003).

== Background ==
In March 1992, Slade disbanded with the departure of lead vocalist Noddy Holder and bassist Jim Lea. That year, guitarist Dave Hill decided to form his own version of the group as Slade II, which included original drummer Don Powell. Steve Whalley was recruited as lead vocalist, Craig Fenney on bass and Steve Makin on guitar. The band played their first gig on 11 December 1992 at Mora in Sweden.

After the release of their debut single, "Hold on to Love", in 1993, Trevor Holliday replaced Fenney on bass. The band recorded Keep on Rockin' at Impuls Studios in Belgium with producer Paul Despiegeleare during September 1994. Although Makin remained with the band until 1996, he was not involved in the recording of the album. It was released in November 1994 by Play That Beat!/Columbia, with a Christmas-themed single, "Merry Xmas Now", being released around the same time.

"Hot Luv" was released as the album's lead single across Europe in March 1995. It was followed by "Black and White World" in July. In Belgium and France, a different version of the song was released, featuring rap artist Daddy K. The band and Daddy K had re-recorded the song together after the idea was suggested by executive producer Marc Debouvier. It was re-titled " Who's to Blame (Black & White World)". Both the album and its singles were commercial failures. Aside from reissues and repackages of the album, Slade II would not release new material until 2002, with the singles "Take Me Home" and "Some Exercise".

In his biography Look Wot I Dun, Powell recalled of the album: "We basically did it in three days. We'd been in the studio, playing together like we used to do in the old days. I remember that when Nod heard the album, he really liked it. He said, 'It sounds like you had so much fun recording it, because you were all in the studio together as a band. That was what we should have been doing at the end.'"

== Release ==
Keep on Rockin! was originally released by Play That Beat! in Europe and the UK, with Columbia releasing the album in Germany. These releases all featured "Merry Xmas Now!" as a bonus track. In December 1995, it was re-released in the UK by Prestige Records Ltd, with "Wild Nites" being included as an eleventh track. In 1996, it was re-issued in Europe by Go On Deluxe.

In 1999, the album was re-issued as Wild Nites in the Netherlands by Experience. Like the Prestige Records release, it included "Wild Nites". In 2002, having reverted their name back to Slade, the album was repackaged as Cum on Let's Party! and released by Virgin in Europe. Featuring the two new singles "Take Me Home" and "Some Exercise", the album re-used four tracks from Keep on Rockin', alongside "Merry Xmas Now!" and "Wild Nites". "Hold On To Love" was also included, alongside the band's 1993 recording "Run Run Rudolph" and a different version of "Red Hot". In 2003, the album was again re-issued as Superyob, released on Hill's own Yob Records. Aside from the original album, it included "Hold on to Love", "Wild Nites" and "Merry Xmas Now".

== Song information ==
Many of the songs on Keep on Rockin! were written by Hill and ex-Wizzard keyboardist Bill Hunt. According to Hill in a 2001 fan club interview, the pair contribute to both the music and lyrics of the songs they write. The pair had started writing and working together since around 1983. Hill had originally planned on recording a solo album using different singers on different tracks. However, only demos would be recorded. In a 1988 fan club interview, he revealed: "I'm writing with a guy called Bill Hunt, whom I've written songs with for about 5 years now. We stockpiled stuff over the years and used several singers." The pair continued working on demos through the 1980s, with Holder contributing vocals on several. The only thing to be officially released would be a version of the Everly Brothers' "Crying in the Rain", which Hill released in 1989 under his project name Blessings in Disguise. It featured Holder, Hunt, Craig Fenney and Bob Lamb.

"Hot Luv" was largely written by Paul Despiegeleare under the pseudonym Paul Mellow. Both Hill and Powell received co-writing credits, with Powell having helped finish the lyrics. "Do You Want Me?", written by Noddy Holder and Hill, was originally recorded by Slade and released as a B-side to their 1971 breakthrough single "Get Down and Get with It". "Red Hot" was written in the 1980s, and recorded and released by Slade in 1991 as the B-side to their final single "Universe". "Dirty Foot Lane" was written solely by Hill who also performed lead vocals on the autobiographical track. "Wild Nites", which was included on some versions of Keep on Rockin', had been originally recorded for Blessings in Disguise and released as the B-side of "Crying in the Rain".

== Critical reception ==
Professional ratings
Review scores
Source	Rating
The Encyclopedia of Popular Music	2/5 stars

In a review of Cum on Let's Party!, Dave Thompson of AllMusic commented: "...it's a mishmash, vaguely entertaining in a "how the mighty have fallen" kind of way but, with the most distinctive 50 percent of the original band (songwriters Noddy Holder and Jim Lea) absent, it really isn't much to write home about."

== Track listing ==
All tracks are written by Dave Hill and Bill Hunt, expect where noted.

No.	Title	Writer(s)	Length
1.	"I Hear Ya Callin'"		3:19
2.	"Hot Luv"	Paul Mellow; Hill; Don Powell	3:20
3.	"Do You Want Me?"	Noddy Holder; Hill	3:19
4.	"Black and White World (Remix)"		3:18
5.	"Miracle"		4:22
6.	"Cum on Let's Party"		2:47
7.	"Johnny Played the Guitar"		3:24
8.	"Howlin' Wind"		3:03
9.	"Red Hot"		3:33
10.	"Dirty Foot Lane"	Hill	4:05

1994 release bonus track
No.	Title	Length
11.	"Merry Xmas Now!"	3:27

1995 Prestige Records release
No.	Title	Length
11.	"Wild Nites"	5:21

== Personnel ==
Slade II

- Steve Whalley - lead vocals, guitar
- Dave Hill - lead guitar, guitars, backing vocals, lead vocal (track 10)
- Trevor Holliday - bass, keyboards, backing vocals
- Don Powell - drums, percussion

Additional personnel

- Paul Despiegeleare - producer
- Stephan Kraemer - engineer
- Alan Ward - mastering
- Jeep Novak - photographs, layout
- Len Tuckey - management
- Marc Debouvier - executive producer
