= Till Deaf Do Us Part =

Studio album by Slade
- Released: 16 November 1981
- Recorded: 1981
- Studio: Portland Studios
- Genre: Hard rock
- Length: 38:41
- Label: RCA Records
- Producer: Slade

Slade chronology
We'll Bring the House Down (1981)	Till Deaf Do Us Part (1981)	Slade on Stage (1982)

Alternative cover
- Cover art for CD reissues in the 1990s

Singles from Till Deaf Do Us Part
- 1. "Knuckle Sandwich Nancy" Released: 15 May 1981; 2. "Lock Up Your Daughters" Released: 4 September 1981; 3. "Ruby Red" Released: 12 March 1982; 4. "Rock and Roll Preacher (Hallelujah I'm on Fire)" Released: April 1982

Till Deaf Do Us Part is the tenth studio album by the British rock group Slade. It was released on 16 November 1981 and reached No. 68 on the UK chart. The album was produced by Slade. Although not as successful as We'll Bring the House Down earlier in the year, this album sold well.

The single "Lock Up Your Daughters" was a UK Top 30 hit – the band opening the 24 September edition of Top of the Pops with it – and became a staple at Slade concerts.

Various re-issues of the album on CD in the 1990s replaced the album's original artwork with a group photo.

== Background ==
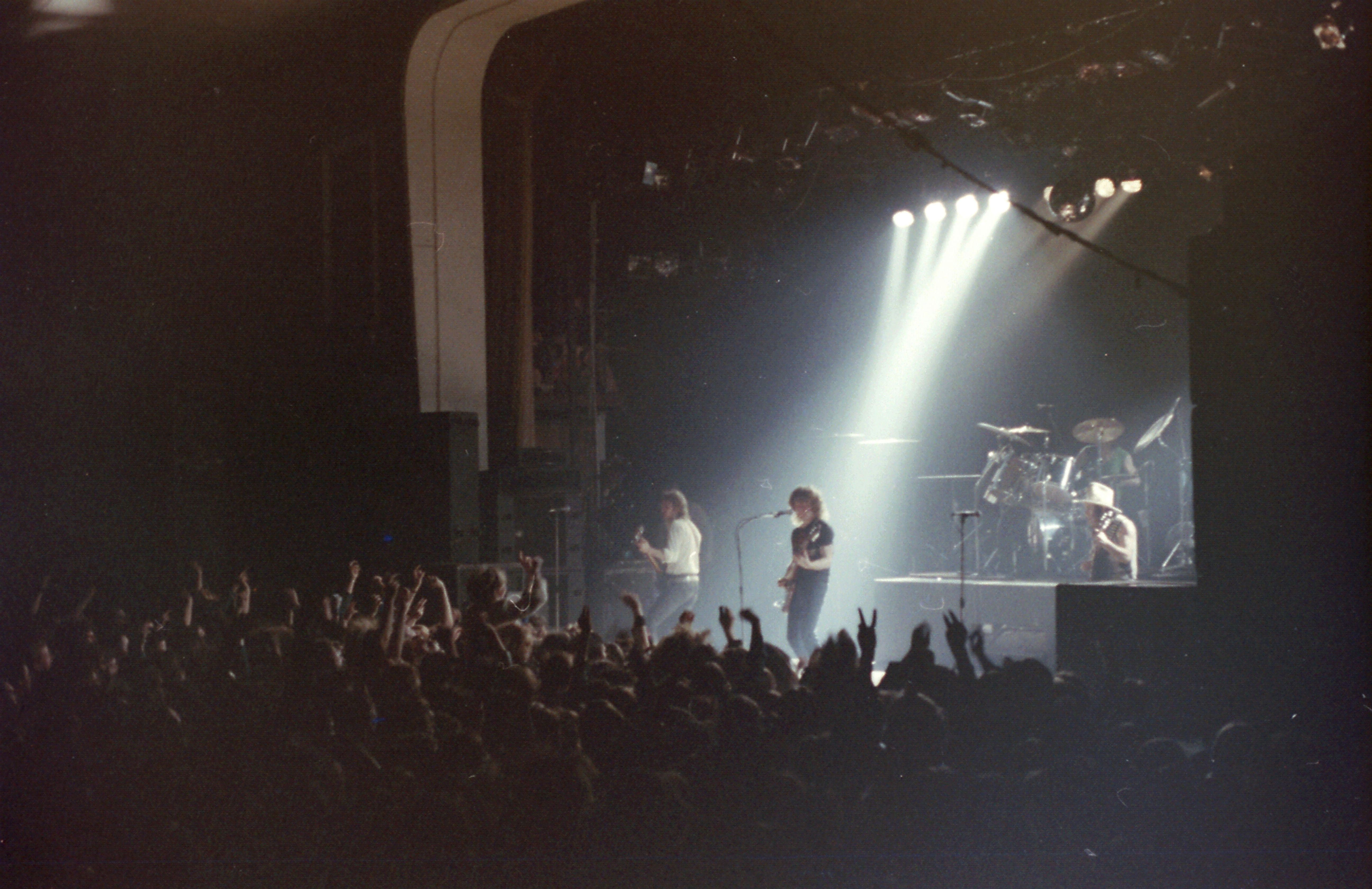
Slade performing at Sophia Gardens, Cardiff in December 1981, a month after the album's release.

Following Slade's performance at the Reading Festival in 1980, interest in the band was revived and the band were now able to fill concert halls once again. The band's 1981 album We'll Bring the House Down was also a success, reaching No. 25 in the UK, while the title track entered the UK Top 10. During the same year, the band continued their resurgence with the recording of Till Deaf Do Us Part. In May 1981, the band released the lead single "Knuckle Sandwich Nancy", however it failed to chart. The band had been confident that the up-tempo record was well-suited as a follow-up to "We'll Bring the House Down", but the band's manager Chas Chandler disagreed. The single was half-heartedly released on the Cheapskate label, with RCA handling marketing and distribution.

The band blamed Chandler for the single's failure and decided to manage themselves from then on, ending a 12 year partnership. However, this did not stop Chandler from negotiating a major record deal with RCA for them. In September, RCA released the second single from the upcoming album, "Lock Up Your Daughters". It reached No. 29 in the UK. In December, Till Deaf Do Us Part was released as the band's RCA debut and first album of all new material since 1979's Return to Base. It reached No. 68 and a few of the album's songs quickly became part of Slade's live set, including "Rock and Roll Preacher" which became the band's new opener. In March 1982, "Ruby Red" was released as the third single, reaching No. 51 in the UK, while in April, "Rock and Roll Preacher (Hallelujah I'm on Fire)" was released in Germany, peaking at No. 49.

Shortly prior to the album's release, guitarist Dave Hill described the album to Sounds: "This album is a thumper and we want it loud. That's the direction we are heading for, like having a live show in the studio almost. It's got guts and melody. That is us really." In a 1981 fan club interview, Holder spoke of the album's title and general theme: "It came about because everyone always says how loud we are. We based the album around volume, all the tracks are rock and it is a loud album. The track 'Till Deaf Do Us Part' is all about bending your ear and being deafened. We've used a lot of organ on the album. That's basically the only difference. We think that it's a much better sound than we've ever had before. It's a solid rock album from start to finish, except for the instrumental piece – which is a slowish theme, but all the others are fast and solid rock. There's no acoustic rock on the album like songs such as 'Don't Waste Your Time' and 'Sign of the Times,' which we have had on previous LPs."

== Song information ==
'Lock Up Your Daughters'
Slade's minor hit of 1981

"Ruby Red"

"Rock and Roll Preacher"
Slade's new opening track for live performances

"Knuckle Sandwich Nancy"

"Ruby Red" had been written around 1978 but the band felt their original recording of it did not meet their expectations. The song was further developed and then recorded for Till Deaf Do Us Part. "She Brings Out the Devil in Me" developed into a song from a lick the band used to play at soundchecks. Holder then added a melody and lyrics to the lick.

"M'Hat, M'Coat" was written by guitarist Dave Hill. Speaking of the song in 1989, Hill said: "It's just something I used to play around with when we were touring Europe and Jim said we should record it. So, we were in the studio and Nod was bashing out a few chords and really Jim rearranged it. We really recorded it on the spur of the moment and I think that's why it turned out so well."

== Critical reception ==
Professional ratings
Review scores
Source	Rating
AllMusic	3/5 stars
Record Mirror	5/5 stars

Upon its release, Robin Smith of Record Mirror praised Till Deaf Do Us Part as "uncompromising entertainment guaranteed" and noted that the band's "old habit of writing classic material has been rekindled". He added, "Slade are a much-needed tonic and it's amazing in the sorry days of '81 that Britain hasn't made much more of them." Peter Kinghorn of the Newcastle Journal stated, "Rousing, anything-goes happy rock may not be subtle, but it's effective." Peter Trollope of the Liverpool Echo described it as Slade's "best album ever" and stated, "No frills, no fuss – honest boogie, and how well they can play. They've been away too long but Till Deaf should put them back in the big time." Dave Murray of the Reading Evening Post noted the album includes "Lock Up Your Daughters" and "many more sing-along foot-stompers" and added that "the great thing is it actually sounds like a live recording".

Ian Ross of the Liverpool Daily Post praised it as "just about the best hard rock album of the year, narrowly squeezing out on the last Def Leppard offering". He added, "The re-emergence of one of this country's finest pop bands has been one of the more pleasing things to come out of 1981. The Wolverhampton stompers have returned with a definite vengeance under a tongue-in-cheek heavy metal guise." James Belsey of the Bristol Evening Post wrote, "One of the most welcome events has been the continuing revival of Slade's fortunes and their new album reflects their newfound confidence. Noddy Holder's maniacal master of ceremonies performance is magnificent, the band play better than ever and good rockers include 'Lock Up Your Daughters', 'It's Your Body Not Your Mind' and 'Ruby Red'." John Coldstream of The Daily Telegraph, in a combined review with AC/DC's For Those About to Rock We Salute You, considered both albums to be the "best of the heavies this month" and noted they are "brutally honest, or rather, honestly brutal".

Jon Young of Trouser Press wrote, "Slade hasn't left 1972, and rightly so! Their ingeniously simple, big-boom approach packs just as much punch today as it did at the height of the glitter era. Give 'em a cheer for persevering; they're stars, whether the records sell or not." Dave Hill (not the Slade guitarist), writing for NME, was negative in his review. He felt the album "hinge[s] entirely on the lame pun of its title" as Slade "proceed to muddle their way through two sides of lads, lager and loose women". He continued, "It's sad. Not only is the record boring and deliberately thick, but it doesn't even work on those terms. Slade sound dreadfully worn out, about as convincing as Alexander Haig on a peace march." In a retrospective review, Geoff Ginsberg of AllMusic called Till Deaf Do Us Part Slade's "hardest-rocking album ever" and continued, "This LP shows a band with renewed enthusiasm and confidence. Their playing is at its fiercest and the material totally kicks ass. Recommended for rockers." In 2004, Q placed the album at number 16 on their "20 Most Painfully Punning Album Titles of All Time" list.

== Track listing ==
All tracks are written by Noddy Holder and Jim Lea, except "M'Hat M'Coat" by Dave Hill.

Side one
No.	Title	Length
1.	"Rock and Roll Preacher (Hallelujah I'm on Fire)"	5:45
2.	"Lock Up Your Daughters"	3:27
3.	"Till Deaf Do Us Part"	3:29
4.	"Ruby Red"	2:53
5.	"She Brings Out the Devil in Me"	3:27

Side two
No.	Title	Length
6.	"A Night to Remember"	3:54
7.	"M'Hat M'Coat"	1:42
8.	"It's Your Body not Your Mind"	3:04
9.	"Let the Rock Roll out of Control"	4:00
10.	"That Was no Lady that Was My Wife"	2:35
11.	"Knuckle Sandwich Nancy"	3:14
12.	"Till Deaf Resurrected"	1:05
Total length:		38:41

2007 Salvo remaster bonus track
No.	Title	Length
13.	"Funk Punk & Junk" (B-side of "Ruby Red")	2:57
Total length:		41:38

== Personnel ==
Slade

- Noddy Holder – lead vocals, rhythm guitar, producer
- Jim Lea – bass, keyboards, backing vocals, producer
- Dave Hill – lead guitar, backing vocals, producer
- Don Powell – drums, producer

Additional personnel

- Andy Miller – assistant producer, engineer
- George "Porky" Peckham – engineer (cutting)
- Mark O'Donoughue – technician (tape operator)

== Charts ==
Weekly chart performance for Till Deaf Do Us Part
Chart (1981)	Peak position
UK Albums (OCC)	68

Weekly chart performance for Till Deaf Do Us Part reissue
Chart (2024)	Position
Scottish Albums (OCC)	81
UK Independent Albums (OCC)	26
UK Rock & Metal Albums (OCC)	10
