= Lock Up Your Daughters (song) =

- Dutch cover of "Lock Up Your Daughters"

Single by Slade

from the album Till Deaf Do Us Part
- B-side: "Sign of the Times"
- Released: 4 September 1981
- Genre: Heavy metal
- Length: 3:26
- Label: RCA
- Songwriter(s): Noddy Holder; Jim Lea
- Producer(s): Slade

Slade singles chronology
| "Knuckle Sandwich Nancy" (1981) | "Lock Up Your Daughters" (1981) | "Ruby Red" (1982) |

Audio sample
- file; help

Alternative Cover
- German cover of "Lock Up Your Daughters".

"Lock Up Your Daughters" is a song by English rock band Slade, released in 1981 as the second single from the band's tenth studio album, Till Deaf Do Us Part. It was written by lead vocalist Noddy Holder and bassist Jim Lea, and was produced by Slade. "Lock Up Your Daughters" reached number 29 in the UK Singles Chart and remained in the top 75 for eight weeks.

== Background ==
Following their revival after their performance at the 1980 Reading Festival, Slade regained success in the UK with their 1981 album We'll Bring the House Down and the Top 10 hit single of the same name. The band then began recording their next album Till Deaf Do Us Part. The first single, "Knuckle Sandwich Nancy", was released in May 1981 but failed to chart. In September, the band followed it up with "Lock Up Your Daughters" which was the band's first single to be released directly under their new label RCA. The single reached No. 29 in the UK, although the band felt sales suffered as their two appearances on Top of the Pops clashed with the showing of the blockbuster films Earthquake and Jaws on ITV.

"Lock Up Your Daughters" saw the band continuing to produce a more heavy metal-influenced sound as their performance at the Reading Festival attracted followers of the New wave of British heavy metal. In addition to the song's chart success, it also became a popular addition to the band's live concerts.

== Promotion ==
A music video was filmed to promote the single, although it received little airing at the time. It was filmed on 7 September 1981 at Portland Studios in London. In the UK, the band performed the song on the music show Top of the Pops, for broadcast on 24 September 1981. The band's performance was repeated on the 8 October edition of the show too. The band also performed the song on the Dutch AVRO TV show TopPop. The music video was part screened on an episode of Tiswas, the video was overlaid with various messages from children in a gaudy greeny yellow colour. It did not see the light of day until 2005 when following the purchase of a video tape by Steve Knight from Mark Richards, David Graham from Slade In England created the documentary bootleg DVD 'One More Time' and included a cleaned up and re edited version that is still doing the rounds today.

== Critical reception ==
Upon its release as a single, "Lock Up Your Daughters" was reviewed on BBC Radio 1's Round Table, where it received a thumbs up from BBC presenter and radio DJ Mike Read, BBC radio presenter Dave Lee Travis and musician Eddy Grant. Garry Bushell of Sounds wrote, "That's more like it. Back down to earth and enjoying every minute of it. Slade give yet more substance to their resurgence as hard rock heroes with this mighty rabble-rousing stomp. Another big new hit. Long may they thrive." He also noted the "catchy Bad Company style chorus". Carol Clerk of Melody Maker called it a "raucous rendering in the glorious traditions of 'Mama Weer All Crazee Now', and possibly their finest moment since then". She continued, "From Noddy's opening scream, you know it's Slade on form: great hot-headed riffs, a rhythm that'll wear out the heels of your boots in ten minutes and a beauty of a chorus. Just watch it go..." Simon Mares of the Reading Evening Post considered Slade to have "very successfully updated their sound" with the track and added that it "has strong heavy metal overtones, yet remains distinctive – and not because of Noddy Holder's vocals".

Celia Barlow of the Telegraph & Argus considered it "vintage Slade, but none the worse for that, with this aggressive pop-rock song". She noted the "good as always vocals" and "well-played solos and unhackneyed instrumentation", but concluded that "it is not striking enough to bring them up on top again". The Walsall Observer noted the song has the "same brutal approach that has brought them a string of hit records", but felt it has "rather limited lyrical appeal and a repetitive drum line, enlivened only by the occasional guitar riff". They concluded, "Slade are capable of producing much better pop songs, but with a strong local following the record will probably prove to be popular in the Midlands." Sunie of Record Mirror was negative in her review, stating, "Slade used to be so distinctive that their current bland, rocky anonymity is a tragedy. They were never my faves – too uncouth – but they did churn out some classic early seventies trashpop. Now they're just another band of HM roisterers, albeit more wizened than most. Awful." Mike Pryce of the Worcester Evening News was also critical, writing, "Right from the shouted intro and the sudden eruption of naked noise, it's Slade and can be no other. They were coming back into fashion a few months ago but this won't continue the trend. Too predictable and rather stale."

In a retrospective review of Till Deaf Do Us Part, Geoff Ginsberg of AllMusic noted that "Lock Up Your Daughters" is "a perfect example of how far the band had come". He added, "It retains the almost bubblegum sound of the earlier singles, while the heavy production style gives it a bit more of a hard-rocking edge." In 2007, rock music journalist Chris Ingham remarked how the song "thumps along like a steamhammer, with the groove and high backing vocals recalling 'Sweet Box' from 1970's Play It Loud, but with kick-heavy production pitching the track firmly in early '80s rock-pop territory".

== Track listing ==
7-inch single (UK, Germany, the Netherlands and Australasia)

1. "Lock Up Your Daughters" – 3:31
2. "Sign of the Times" – 3:58

== Personnel ==
Slade

- Noddy Holder – lead vocals, guitar
- Dave Hill – lead guitar, backing vocals
- Jim Lea – bass, organ, backing vocals
- Don Powell – drums

Production

- Slade – production

== Charts ==
| Chart (1981) | Peak position |
|---|---|
| Netherlands (Dutch Top 40) | 17 |
| Netherlands (Single Top 100) | 19 |
| UK Singles (OCC) | 29 |
| UK Top 100 Singles (Record Business) | 28 |
