= Dave Hill (guitarist) =

English musician (born 1946)

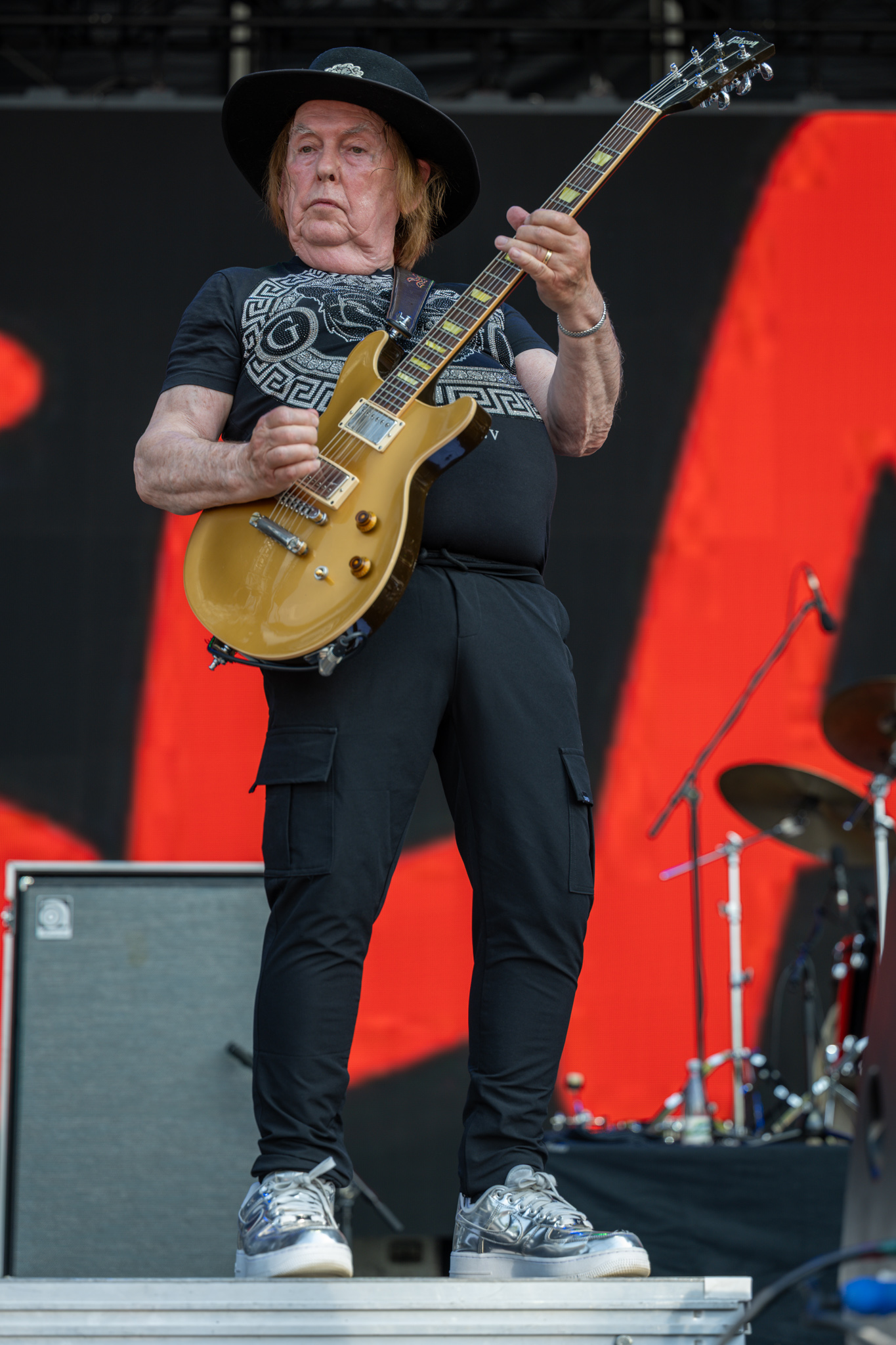
- Hill performing with Slade in 2025

Background information
- Born: David John Hill; 4 April 1946 (age 80); Holbeton, Devon, England
- Origin: Wolverhampton, Staffordshire, England
- Genres: Glam rock; Hard rock
- Occupation: Musician
- Instruments: Guitar; Bass guitar
- Years active: 1963–present

David John Hill (born 4 April 1946) is an English rock musician. He is the lead guitarist, a backing vocalist and the sole continuous member in the English band Slade. During the 1970s, Hill was known for his flamboyant stage clothes and hairstyle.

== Early life ==
Born in Flete House, Holbeton, Devon, the son of a mechanic, he moved with his parents to Penn, Wolverhampton, when he was a year old. He attended the city's Springdale Junior School and Highfields Secondary school. He bought his first guitar from a mail-order catalogue and received some guitar lessons from a science teacher at his school. He then formed a band called The Young Ones with some school friends. He worked in an office for Tarmac Limited for over two years after leaving school.

== Career ==
=== Slade ===
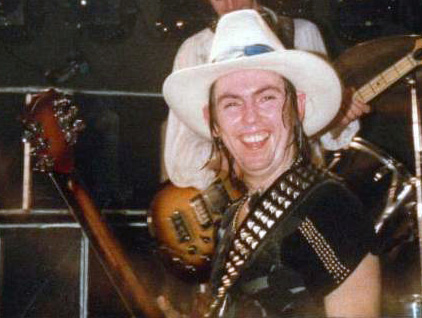
Hill performing at Cardiff University in 1981

Hill originally played with drummer Don Powell in a band called The Vendors, whose name was then changed to The N' Betweens. The pair then met bass player Jim Lea and singer Noddy Holder, whereafter Slade was born. Hill co–wrote a few songs for their first two albums, Beginnings and Play It Loud, but after that the songwriting was mostly done by Holder and Lea. Hill wrote only one song for their 1981 album Till Deaf Do Us Part, "M'Hat M'Coat".

Slade finally split up in 1992, but Hill decided to carry the group on as Slade II. Don Powell joined him and the band has continued for many years with various line-ups. In 2002, the name of Slade II was shortened back to Slade. The band released the album Keep on Rockin' in 1994, which has also been re-packaged as Superyob, and also as Cum on Let's Party! Hill wrote most of the material for the album.

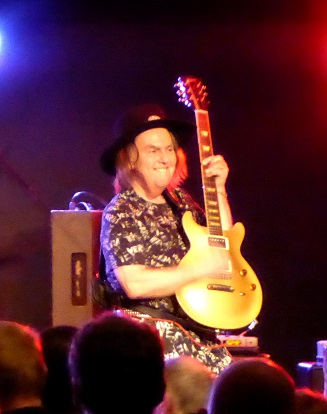
Hill performing with Slade at Weymouth Pavilion in 2016

Hill is the only constant member of the band, following the 2020 firing of longtime original drummer Don Powell.

=== Outside work ===
During 1983, both Hill and Powell were working on a Dave Hill solo project with local musicians around the Midlands area. By 1984, the project had not been completed. The then-editor of the Slade fan club, Haden Donovan, described the project as "very interesting and very un-Slade-like."

In 1989, Hill formed his own group, Blessings in Disguise. This featured Holder, ex-Wizzard keyboard player Bill Hunt, Craig Fenney and Bob Lamb. The debut single, released in 1989 for the Christmas market, was a ballad cover of The Everly Brothers' "Crying in the Rain" with Holder drafted in for lead vocals, backed by a Hill/Hunt composition, "Wild Nights". The record was a commercial failure. The band also recorded a cover of the Elvis Presley song "A Fool Such As I" which was unreleased.

Hill attended the launch of a £2 million appeal to raise funds for Queen Alexandra College for the Blind in Birmingham. There he heard a song called "A Chance to Be", sung by blind and visually-impaired children. Hill was so moved by the occasion that he agreed to perform and produce the recording of the song. The two writers of the song were staff at the institute, Daniel Somers and Colin Baines. Hill's band name, Blessing in Disguise, was picked as the group name and the single featured ex-Shakatak female vocalist Norma Lewis rather than Holder. The B-side was a track written by Hill entitled "You're the Reason that I'm Strong". It was the last recording made by the group and was released in 1991.

Hill's debut solo album, Dirty Foot Lane, was released on 30 October 2026 by JCPL Records. It has been described as a "rich, autobiographical collection of songs reflecting a lifetime of music, creativity and personal discovery".

== Style ==
=== Fashion ===
Hill is known for his outrageous costumes. The music journalist Stuart Maconie commented:

[H]e usually wore a jumpsuit made of the foil that you baste your turkeys in and platforms of oil-rig-derrick height. All of this though paled in comparison with his coiffure, a sort of demented tonsure with a great scooping fringe. He even had one outfit around 1973 famously called his 'Metal Nun' suit but later styles were much toned down.

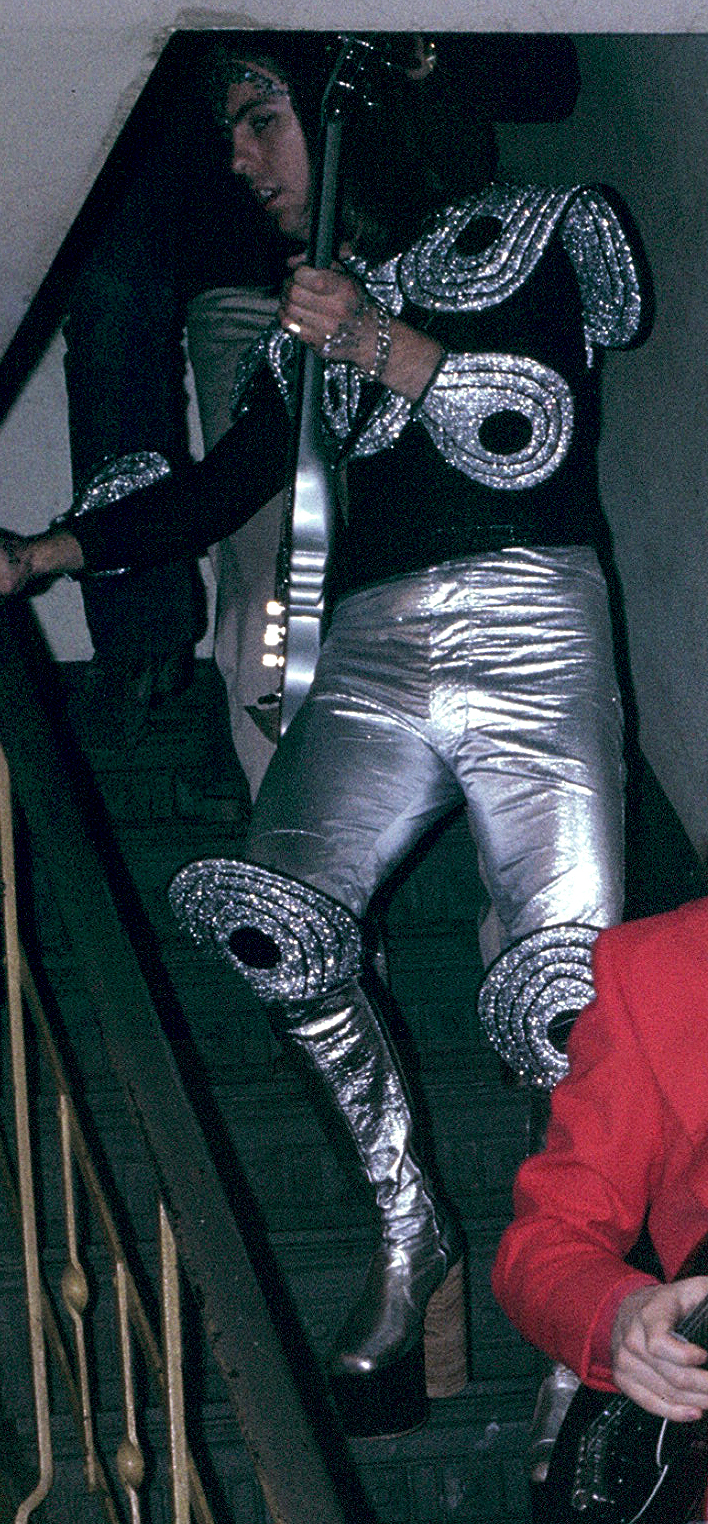
Hill in his Slade stage clothes in 1973

His costumes and antics caused some friction with the more serious Lea. This led to a show-down in a BBC dressing room before a recording of Top of the Pops, where Hill replied to the band's criticism of his dress by saying "You write 'em Jim, I'll sell em!" Although he was famous for his hairstyle, he shaved his entire head completely bald in 1977; he kept his head clean-shaven before growing his trademark hairstyle back a few years later.

=== Equipment ===
Though Hill is left-handed, he plays guitar right-handed. Hill's best known guitar was the "John Birch Superyob" that was built in 1973. The guitar was used by Madness guitarist Chris Foreman in the video for Madness' song "Shut Up" and was later owned by Marco Pirroni of Adam and the Ants.

== Personal life ==
He embraced the image of a yob for performances. As well as the references to "Superyob" above, Hill, since a young age used the numberplate "YOB 1" on his cars. Hill married his wife Jan in Mexico City in the 1970s, and they have three children: Jade, Bibi, and Sam. They live in Lower Penn, Wolverhampton, England, where Hill occasionally teaches music at Lower Penn School and Penn Hall School.

=== Health ===
During a concert in Nuremberg, Germany in 2010, Hill suffered a stroke; he recovered and continued touring and recording. In December 2016, Hill was knocked down by a cyclist in Brighton. He suffered a broken elbow as a result of the accident, and Slade called off shows planned for early 2017.

== Autobiography ==
Hill published his autobiography, entitled So Here It Is: The Autobiography, in November 2017.

Hill had first announced the idea of releasing a biography in the early 1990s. In a 1992 interview with the Slade fan club, he said: "I approached John Ogden of the Wolverhampton Express and Star with a view to putting down some of my experiences and stories, to see if a book could be produced that would be entertaining and amusing."

Later in November 2016, Hill announced he was in the process of writing an autobiography, with a possible 2017 release through Unbound, subject to it reaching the online pledge target. He revealed: "I've written my autobiography for my fans and for my family, especially my grandkids. I've got plenty of funny tales but also some others which show that my life hasn't been all rock 'n' roll." So Here It Is: The Autobiography was released on 16 November 2017. Noddy Holder provided the foreword and Noel Gallagher the afterword.

== Discography ==
=== Albums ===
Date	Title	Type
2026	Dirty Foot Lane	Studio

=== Singles ===
Date	Title	Album
2026	"Play It to the Crowd"	Dirty Foot Lane
2026	"She Had a Troubled Heart"	Dirty Foot Lane
2026	"Dirty Foot Lane"	Dirty Foot Lane
